= List of drive-in restaurants =

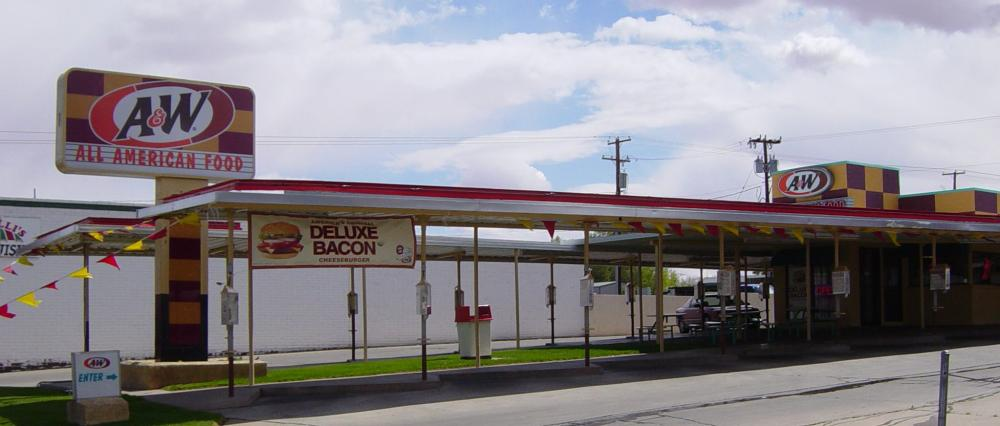
An American A&W Restaurant in Page, Arizona

This is a list of notable drive-in restaurants.

A drive-in restaurant is one where a customer can drive in with an automobile for service. For example, customers park their vehicles and are usually served by staff who walk out to take orders and return with food, encouraging diners to remain parked while they eat. Often, the restaurant staff attach a serving tray to a window of the vehicle.

It is usually distinguished from a drive-through. At a drive-through restaurant, conversely, customers wait in a line and pass by one or more windows to order, pay, and receive their food.

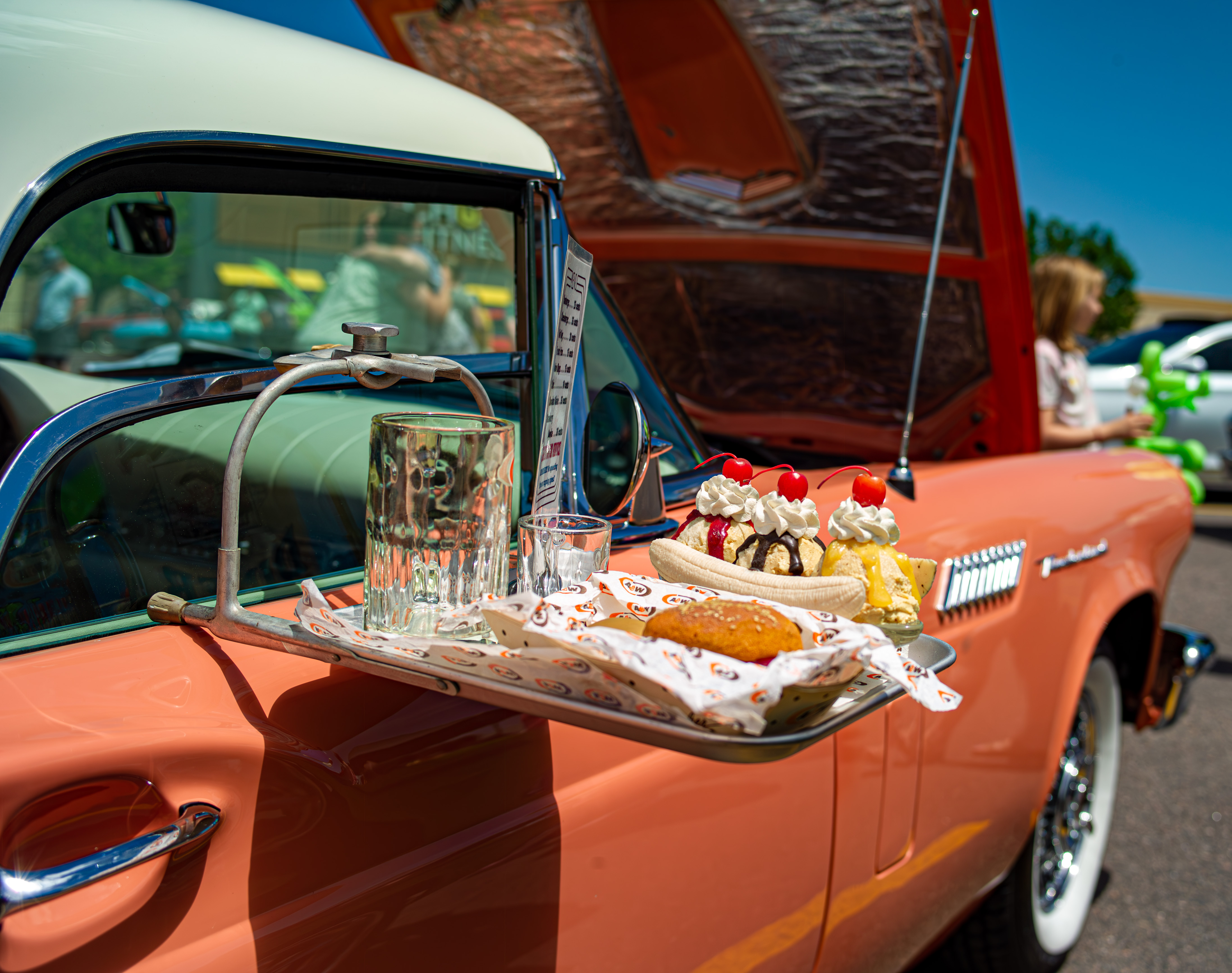
Drive-in Tray. Setup to simulate 1950s restaurant.

== Drive-in restaurants ==
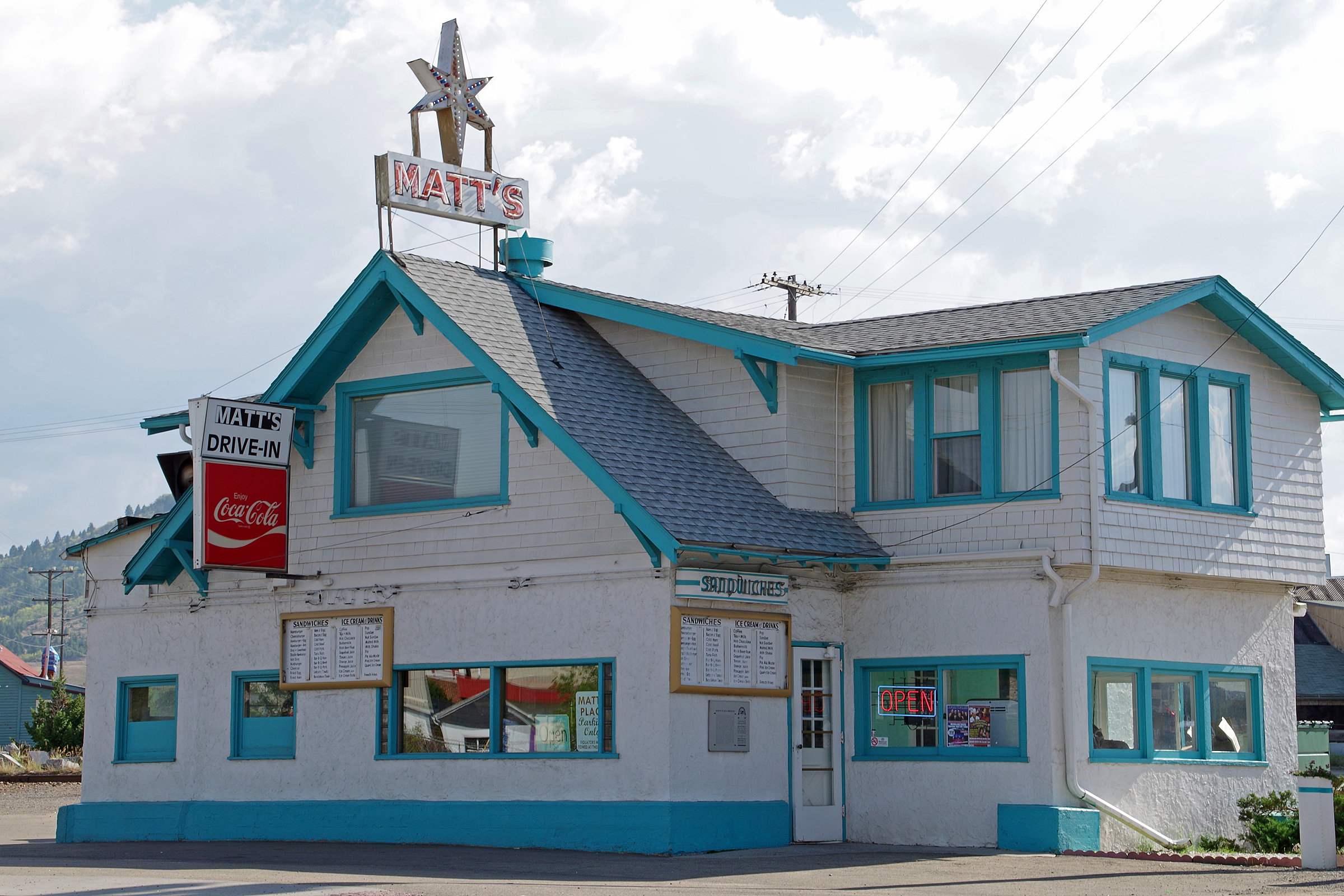
Matt's Place Drive-In in Butte, Montana, is on the U.S. National Register of Historic Places

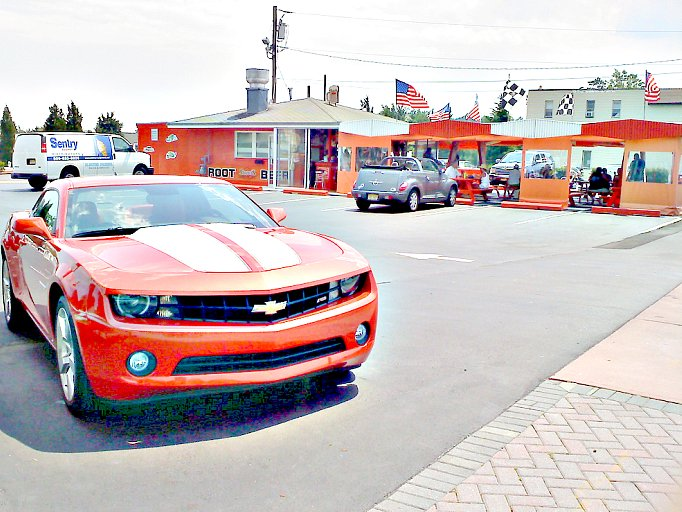
A Stewart's Restaurants drive-in in Tuckerton, New Jersey, which has been in continuous operation since the 1970s

- A&W (Canada)
- A&W Restaurants
- B&K Rootbeer, Midwestern U.S.
- Big Boy Restaurants
- Checkers and Rally's
- The Chickenburger, Bedford, Nova Scotia, Canada
- Circus Drive-In, until 2017, New Jersey, U.S.
- Dee's Drive-In (now Hardee's)
- Dick's Drive-In, Seattle, Washington, U.S.
- Dog n Suds, Midwestern U.S.
- Gibeau Orange Julep, Montreal, Quebec, Canada
- Ivanhoe's Restaurant, Upland, Indiana, U.S.
- Jim's Restaurants, Texas, U.S.
- The Kegs Drive-In, Grand Forks, North Dakota, U.S.
- Kirby's Pig Stand
- Matt's Place Drive-In, Butte, Montana, U.S.
- Mel's Drive-In, San Francisco, California, U.S. (since demolished)
- Mike's Drive-In, Oregon, U.S.
- Mug-n-Bun, Speedway, Indiana, U.S.
- Peters' Drive-In, Alberta, Canada, 3 Locations
- Sonic Drive-In
- Stewart's Restaurants
- Sugarpine Drive-In, Troutdale, Oregon, U.S.
- Superdawg, Chicago, Illinois, U.S.
- Swensons, Ohio, U.S.
- The Varsity, Atlanta, Georgia, U.S.
- Webers Root Beer
- White Spot
- Zesto Drive-In

== See also ==
- Carhop
- List of drive-in theaters
- Lists of restaurants
