= Bob's Big Boy =

American restaurant chain

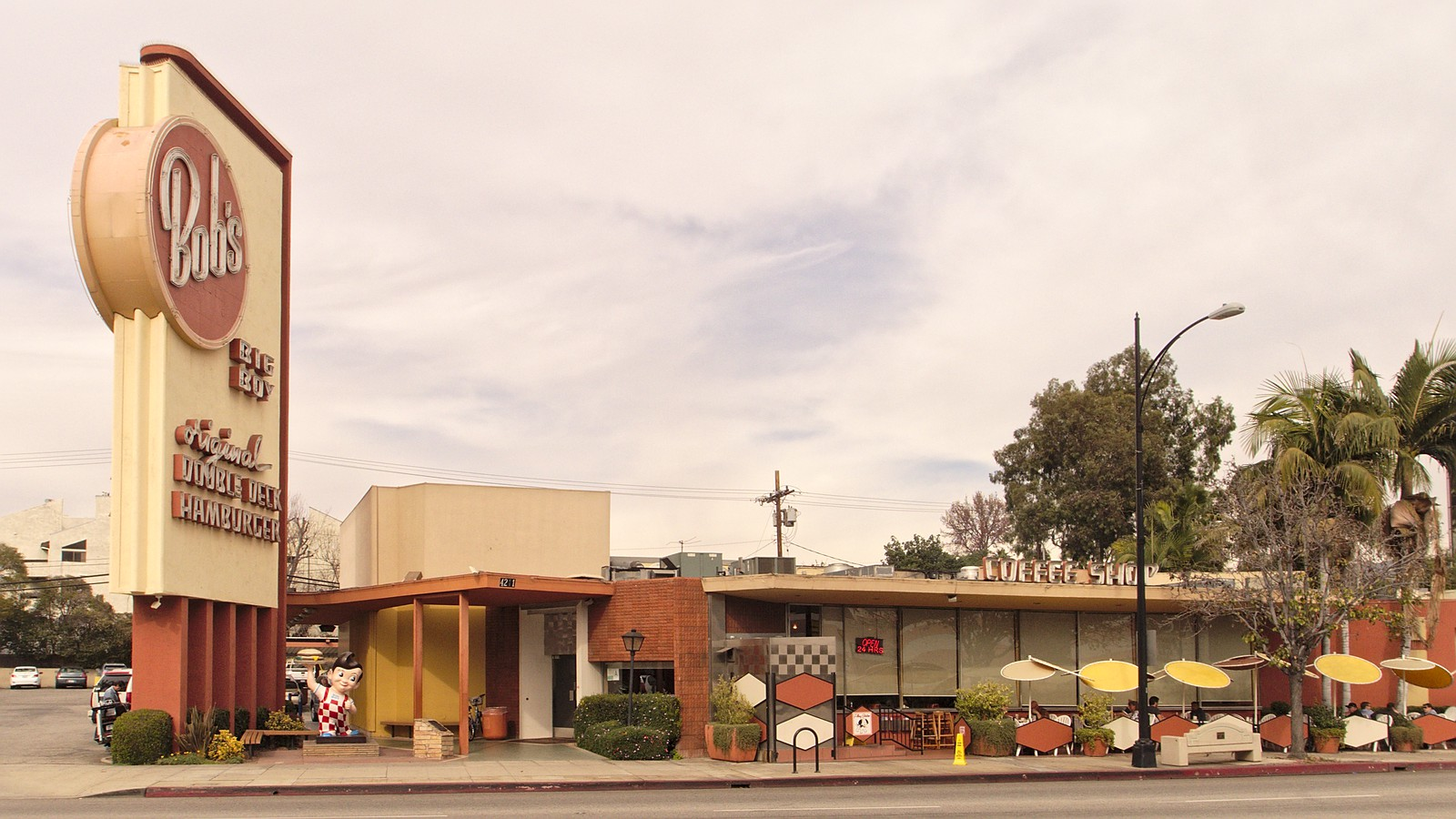
- Bob's Big Boy restaurant in Burbank, 2014
- Formerly: Bob’s Pantry (1936-1938)
- Type: Subsidiary
- Industry: Casual dining restaurant
- Founded: August 6, 1936; 90 years ago (as Bob's Pantry); Glendale, California, U.S.
- Founder: Bob Wian
- Area served: Burbank, California; Downey, California; Norco, California; Northridge, California
- Products: Big Boy hamburger; Hot Fudge Cake; Strawberry pie
- Parent: Big Boy Restaurants
- Website: bobs.net

Bob's Big Boy is a casual dining restaurant chain founded by Bob Wian in Southern California in 1936, originally named Bob's Pantry. The chain's signature product is the Big Boy hamburger, which Wian created six months after opening his original location. Slicing a bun into three slices and adding two hamburger patties, Wian is credited with creating the original double-decker (or "double-deck") hamburger.

When Wian began franchising his restaurant across the United States in 1940s, the name "Bob's Big Boy" was only used for the directly owned-and-operated locations, while franchisees were required to substitute a different name for Bob's. This arrangement continued after the parent corporation was sold to Marriott Corporation in 1967. In 1987, Marriott sold the Big Boy trademark to Elias Brothers, the Michigan Big Boy franchisee, but the Bob's Big Boy name was retained for Marriott's locations, now as a franchisee. Marriott decided to divest itself of its food service operations in the early 1990s, and upon being sold most Bob's Big Boy locations were rebranded, often outside the Big Boy system.

At its peak in 1989, there were over 240 locations throughout the country that included "Bob's" name. With the closing of the Calimesa, California, restaurant in 2020, only four locations remain using the full "Bob's Big Boy" branding, all in the Los Angeles, California, area. Among those restaurants, two are now protected historic landmarks: the Burbank location on Riverside Drive and the Downey location, previously known as Johnie's Broiler. The other two Bob's Big Boy restaurants are in Norco and Northridge. The other locations across the United States, either directly under the Big Boy Restaurant Group or operated independently by trademark co-registrant Frisch's Big Boy, continue to omit "Bob's".

== Bob Wian ownership ==
=== Background ===
Bob Wian entered Glendale High School as the Great Depression started in 1929. When his father's furniture business went bankrupt, Wian washed dishes in the school cafeteria to pay for lunch. Not being a committed student – he never took homework home – classmates voted Wian most unlikely to succeed. However, his father's business failure and classmates' doubts would lead Wian to success.

After graduation in 1933, Wian found work as the overnight dishwasher at a Los Angeles White Log Coffee Shop, a West Coast chain similar to White Castle. Suddenly he was interested in how a restaurant worked and how it could be improved; he became determined to own a restaurant or even a chain. And he was intent on proving his classmates wrong.

Wian was promoted to fry cook and then a manager. He learned the White Log system, its merchandising and pricing of foods, and use of a central commissary; Wian would later apply these concepts to Big Boy. He would also adopt White Log's pancake batter recipe. At White Log he befriended fellow fry cook Bennie Washam, who would later sketch the original Big Boy mascot. (Note: Sigall, Martha (2005). Living Life Inside the Lines: Tales from the Golden Age of Animation. Univ. Press of Mississippi. pp. 91–92. ISBN 9781578067497. Note: This book correctly identifies Washam as a fry cook and designer of the original Big Boy mascot. However, no other reference states that he worked for or was a partner with Bob Wian, but Hansen says Washam worked with Wian at a White Log Coffee Shop. (The statues were created about 20 years later and modeled on a revised design by Manfred Bernhard.))

Bob Wian, founder of Bob's Big Boy, about 1948

Wanting wider experience, Wian quit and took a dishwashing job with his favorite Glendale restaurant, Lionel Sternberger's Rite Spot. (Note: Wian worked at Sternberger's Rite Spot Cafe at 606 East Colorado Boulevard in Glendale. Sternberger also operated a Rite Spot at 1500 West Colorado Boulevard in Pasadena.) Again he was promoted to counterman and fry cook. The man who hired Wian and was his boss, Leonard Dunagan, would later be hired by Wian and became vice president of Bob's Big Boy. (Note: Wian likewise formed a close working relationship with Davis Wood, his manager at White Log Coffee Shop, and later hired Wood as purchasing agent for Bob's Big Boy.)

Wian discovered how Rite Spot made its chili, hamburgers, and red hamburger relish – the same relish Wian would use on the Big Boy hamburger. And he learned the importance of consistency in foods served.

The Rite Spot also offered curb service, as Bob's Big Boy would several years later. (His sister Dottie was a carhop at the Rite Spot before moving to Bob's Big Boy.) However, Wian's first drive-in work was at a Pig Stand. The restaurants used pig-shaped die-cut menus and some had a big pig in front; similarly, Bob's would use Big Boy shaped die-cut menus and later display large Big Boy statues out in front.

Wian also patronized other restaurants looking for additional menu items, attempting to recreate the favored items at home, and sometimes prodding food suppliers for how they were made. Bob's hot fudge sundae, for example, was adopted from the sundae served at Hollywood ice cream parlor C.C. Brown's.

Wian claimed that there was nothing new at Bob's Big Boy – excepting the double-deck Big Boy hamburger – and that he was building Big Boy in his mind while at these previous jobs. Confident from his restaurant employment and encouraged by his father, he was already looking for a location when The Pantry was placed for sale.

=== Bob's Big Boy under Bob Wian (1936–1967) ===
In August 1936, Wian quit his job at the Rite Spot and sold his 1933 DeSoto Roadster for $300 to make the down payment on a 10-stool hamburger stand in Glendale called The Pantry. (Note: Some sources say Wian sold his car for $350, however, sources providing more detail, tend to say $300, this money used for the building itself. Several sources also refer to an additional $50 raised for initial food and supplies. Most sources simply say Wian bought the Pantry with money from selling his car. Yet Wian's detailed narrative in Hansen refers to paying an additional $25 monthly, and $300 is similar to down payments Wian made on adjacent properties purchased over time.) He cleaned the place until it "shine[d] like a brand new penny", borrowed $50 from his father for meat and supplies, and reopened as Bob's Pantry. Six months later, Wian assembled his special double-decker hamburger. Created as a joke for a customer wanting something different, the novel hamburger began drawing business. The "snappy" name given to the popular sandwich provided a new name for his restaurant: Bob's Big Boy.

Wian opened a second drive-in in Burbank in 1938, launching drive-in curb service at both locations. During World War II, Wian experienced shortages of both meat and manpower, and one of the four Bob's then in operation closed. Soon after the war – in 1946 – Wian formed Robert C. Wian Enterprises to assume his restaurant business.

In the late 1940s, Wian licensed two operators in the East to sell his Big Boy hamburger, Frisch's Big Boy in Cincinnati and Eat'n Park Big Boy in Pittsburgh; this served Wian's goal to procure and maintain a national trademark. In 1951, the third licensee Alex Schoenbaum of Shoney's Big Boy sold Wian on a formal franchising system, and with the popularity of the drive-in restaurant, a series of franchising and subfranchising Big Boy followed in the 1950s. The franchisees were required to sell the Big Boy hamburger and use their own name with Big Boy, not Bob's.

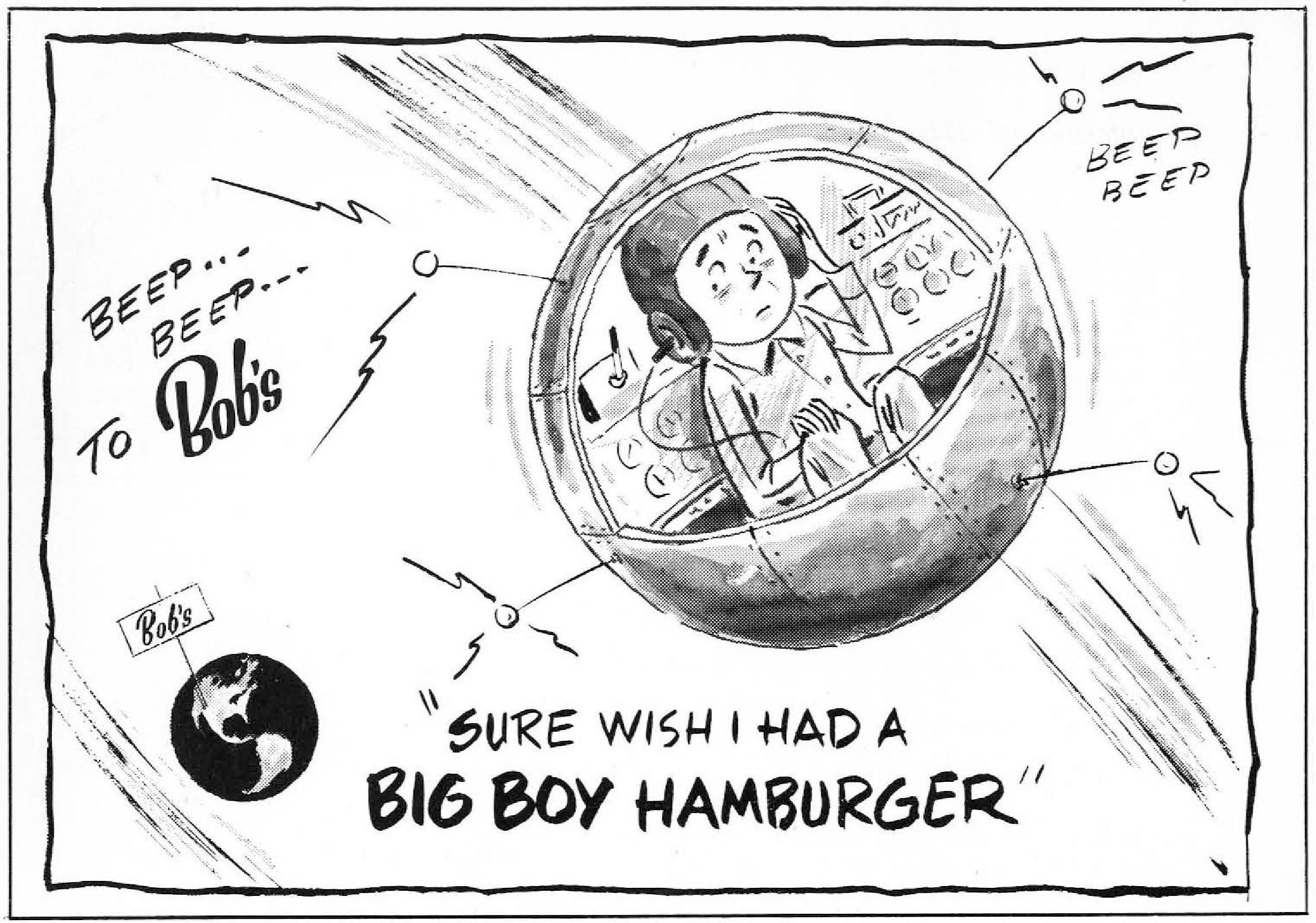
A Bob's ad in the California Institute of Technology yearbook of 1958. This ad spoofs Sputnik, which had stunned the world on its successful October 4, 1957, launch.

By 1951, eight Bob's Big Boys were in operation. The Bob's imprint of the first (1956) edition of Adventures of the Big Boy comic book lists ten locations, including one in Arizona, while a legal filing claims twelve locations. The 18th Bob's opened in 1963, and the chain's 1965 menu lists 23 California restaurants (including one opening in late 1965 and another in 1966) and six Arizona restaurants, which represented about 5% of the national Big Boy chain.

Wian provided his workers health insurance and a profit-sharing plan, which included the option of employees to franchise a Bob's. In 1955 the first such unit opened in Phoenix, another opened in Tucson in 1962 and three more locations by 1968. (By 1974 there were nine Phoenix metropolitan area Bob's, including one under construction, when the units were acquired by JB's Big Boy for $2.7 million.)

=== Philosophy and practices ===
Bob Wian developed rules and philosophies about how Big Boy should operate. Besides the Big Boy hamburger and its construction, he attributed most of his success and that of his franchisees to following these rules. His fundamental restaurant principles were: "serve the best quality food, at moderate prices, in spotless surroundings, with courtesy and hospitality." He believed "the customer is always right" and instructed employees that, "if any food item is not satisfactory, return it cheerfully and apologize for the error". Wian said he had five basic rules for building his business: "be a good place to work for, sell to, buy from, and invest in. And be a good neighbor in the community." He also attributed the growth to, "capable management and a conservative policy of not trying to seat more people than can be served or opening more restaurants than can be serviced." If some disruption occurred at a restaurant, such as a new manager or renovation, Wian would postpone advertising until operations would return to his standards.

Typical of Big Boy restaurants, Elby's Big Boy used a nine-step process for waiting on dining room customers:

1. Greet customers within one minute of being seated, serving water and taking beverage orders.
2. Serve beverages and take meal orders.
3. Call in meal orders to kitchen.
4. Place setups (e.g., silverware) and condiments, serve salad items.
5. Watch kitchen (number panel) for completed order and promptly serve meals to table. (The kitchen should complete orders within 8 minutes, 10 minutes for steaks.)
6. Check back with customers within a few minutes: "Is everything OK?"
7. Return and place check on the table: "I'll return shortly."
8. Suggest dessert and take dessert orders.
9. Serve desserts or deliver final check, remove empty dishes.

Bob Wian was discerning of employees, hiring wait staff—which he considered a profession—by appearance, intelligence and enthusiasm. He preferred employees with little or no restaurant experience which afforded training in the Big Boy tradition. Wian said that he "conned [employees] into believing in themselves ... I put my cooks in chef's outfits, even though they couldn't boil an egg". Other than wait staff, employees typically started as dishwashers and busboys, and advanced to short-order cooks, and then possibly to management. Bob's Big Boy was one of the first restaurant chains to offer health insurance and profit-sharing to employees.

Bob Wian excelled at franchise relations. He led 20-person training crews to open new Big Boy restaurants, made periodic nationwide tours of the franchises, was available for consultations and claimed to know every manager's name. He also assembled the principal franchisees as board members of the National Big Boy Association to participate in leadership. After Wian left, some Big Boy operators began to question the value of their franchise.

== Marriott ownership ==
=== As franchisor (1967–1987) ===
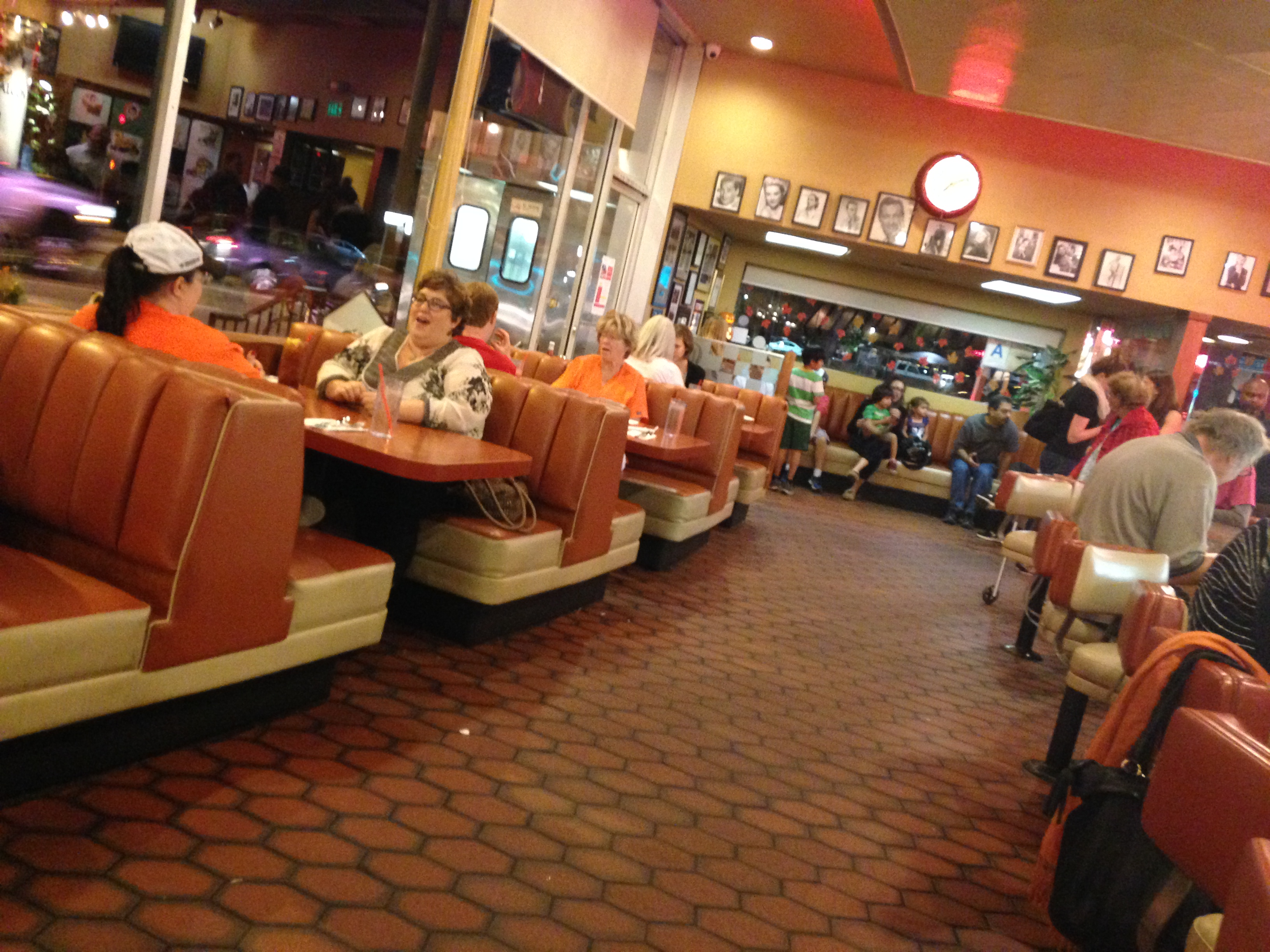
Inside Bob's Big Boy, Burbank, CA in 2014.

In 1961, a merger was briefly explored with the John R. Thompson Co., a Chicago-based restaurant operator. Five years later another merger was proposed, and in May 1967, Big Boy was sold to the Marriott Corporation. In addition to the trademark, the sale included Wian's 22 company-owned Bob's Big Boys. (Another 580 franchised Big Boy restaurants operated in 38 states nationwide.)

After the merger, Wian remained as president of Marriott's new "Big Boy Restaurants of America" division. Used to dealing with franchisees and store managers on a personal level, he became overwhelmed with the increasing size of the chain, describing it as "this monster I built". Also unhappy with Marriott's new focus on rapid growth and corporate profits, over his approach and practices, Wian became discouraged and resigned as president in May 1968. He accepted membership on Marriott's board but, his guidance never sought, Wian likewise quit that position in the summer of 1969. (Note: One exception was naming Marriott's Roy Rogers Restaurants. After acquiring Bob's Big Boy, Marriott acquired the RoBee's Roast Beef chain but needed a new, preferably recognizable, name for national expansion. As a board member, Wian proposed Marriott approach Roy Rogers; they did, Rogers agreed, and his name was branded to RoBee's, converted Junior Hot Shoppes, and the new chain generally. Wian joined Rogers and wife Dale Evans at ground breakings of several namesake units.) Although he attended the 1972 annual Big Boy Executive Conference, Wian generally avoided Bob's Big Boys and refused invitations to special events at the restaurants. He remained close friends with longtime associates at Big Boy.

Marriott began rapid expansion using the Bob's name that it now owned. By 1971 there were 49 California Bob's, and by 1979, 132. It bought the Ken's Big Boy franchise in the Washington, DC-Baltimore metropolitan area in 1969 and JB's Big Boy's franchise in New Jersey in 1975, rebranding them as Bob's. In the mid-1970s Bob's Big Boy expanded into Alaska and Hawaii. Marriott also bought the 39-unit Manners Big Boy chain in 1974 which may have been renamed Bob's Big Boy in 1979. The 26 operating Cleveland-area restaurants were sold to and rebranded Elias Brothers Big Boy in 1985.

In 1985, as part of a lawsuit settlement, JB's Big Boy paid $7 million in exchange for additional territory, including central and northern California, Oregon, Washington, Nevada and Arizona where it operated as Bob's Big Boy; JB's also purchased 29 existing Bob's Big Boy restaurants from Marriott. However, citing a lack of benefit except use of the Big Boy symbol for its over $1 million annual franchise fees, in 1988 JB's allowed its Big Boy franchise to expire, removing 110 units from the Big Boy system.

=== As franchisee (1987–1990s) ===
In 1987, Marriott sold the Big Boy trademark to Elias Brothers, the Michigan Big Boy franchisee, but retained the Bob's Big Boy name and restaurants as a franchisee. (Note: After Eat'n Park, Shoney's, the largest franchisee, and Elby's left Big Boy, and JB's having sued to leave, combined with Frisch's exemption from paying any fees, Marriott found owning the Big Boy system to be unprofitable. Nation's Restaurant News sources suggested Big Boy was simply given to Elias Brothers without cost.) At the time, Marriott operated 208 Bob's Big Boys, including company-owned Bob's in Maryland, Virginia, New York, New Jersey, Pennsylvania, Florida, and the District of Columbia. Many of these eastern Bob's were sited at rest stops on interstate toll roads, often conversions of recently purchased Howard Johnson's restaurants, while others were in territory that belonged to previous franchisees. Several Bob's Big Boy restaurants, such as five in the Harrisburg, Pennsylvania area and two along the Ohio Turnpike were not owned by Marriott.

Marriott kept its company-owned Bob's units under franchise after the sale to Elias Brothers, and the number of such Bob's increased to 238 by 1989 when Marriott decided to divest itself of its food service operations. In 1991, already having converted some San Diego stores to Allie's, named after J. Willard Marriott's wife Alice, it sold 104 California Bob's (to a company which outbid Elias Brothers) removing the units from the Bob's chain and the Big Boy system. Toll road Bob's Big Boys remained in service longer due to Marriott's contractual obligations, but are no longer in operation. Privately owned Eastern U.S. Bob's were also sold.

== Recent history (2000–present) ==
When Robert Liggett (i.e., Big Boy Restaurants International) bought Big Boy from the bankrupt Elias Brothers in 2000, ten western Bob's Big Boys were in operation, dropping to eight by 2006. The last Bob's in Hawaii closed after suffering a fire in 2009.

Further shrinking their territory was the 2001 deal Liggett and Big Boy Restaurants International made with Frisch's. The Big Boy trademarks in Kentucky, Indiana, and most of Ohio and Tennessee transferred to Frisch's ownership; all other Frisch's territories transferred to Liggett. As a franchisee, the Elias Brothers bankruptcy had threatened Frisch's future use of the Big Boy trademark, but it was forever resolved by this deal. Under the agreement, Frisch's is no longer a franchisee, but Big Boy Restaurant Group and Frisch's are now independent co-registrants of the Big Boy name and trademark.

Now limited to California, Bob's grew to 16 restaurants by 2011, but started to decline again. Although Big Boy Restaurants International expected to open 140 California units by 2018, only a handful of Bob's Big Boy Restaurants remain, all in the Greater Los Angeles Area of Southern California.

In 2018, Liggett sold the parent company which was renamed Big Boy Restaurant Group. The company franchises both Bob's Big Boy and non–branded Big Boy restaurants.

== Sauce and dressing retail business ==
Bob Wian started a food manufacturing company, the "Specialty Products Division" to manufacture and sell Bob's Big Boy branded salad dressings, relish, and seasoning salt. This division was purchased along with the restaurant chain by Marriott Corporation.

Marriott sold it to entrepreneur Kathy Taggares in June 1987. She changed the name to K.T.'s Kitchens and continued manufacturing products for the restaurants and for retail stores. Taggares manufactured 10,000 gallons of salad dressing a day utilizing natural products and French cheeses. She noted that only 20% of her sales came from the 223 Big Boy restaurants open at the time. “I basically bought a $6-million company with $200,000 in cash,” Taggares told the Los Angeles Times in 1989. She sold her "life insurance policy, her condominium and all her jewelry to raise the money." Taggares relocated the plant from Glendale, California to Carson, California, added frozen pizzas, and had over 300 employees as of 2019.

The rights to Bob's Big Boy salad dressing and sauces were acquired by The Flavor of California, a partnership between Julie Pantiskas, former owner of the Nut Tree restaurant in Northern California, and Salt Creek Capital formed in February 2019. The company, based in Pasadena, California currently makes Bob's famous Bleu Cheese, Thousand Island, Ranch Country, Roquefort, and Lite Bleu Cheese dressings, as well as tartar sauce and seafood sauce. The product is sold in Target, Costco, Walmart, and supermarkets in 14 Western states. The one-pint glass jars are printed with a mid 1950s Bob's logo and modified Big Boy mascot.

== Notable restaurants ==
Beginning in the late 1950s, many Bob's Big Boy restaurants were designed by Armet & Davis, an architectural firm noted for its contributions to Googie architecture. The firm was hired in 1958 to produce stock plans for Bob's and various Big Boy franchises nationwide.

=== Burbank ===
Original Bob's Big Boy Restaurants
Unit No.	Address	City	Condition	Ref.
1	900 E Colorado St.	Glendale	Demolished	
2	624 S San Fernando Road	Burbank	Demolished	
3	3212 La Crescenta Ave.	Glendale	Transformed	
4	115 W Broadway (original); 121 E Broadway (moved)	Glendale	Transformed	
5	1801 Colorado Blvd.	Eagle Rock	Transformed	
6	4211 W Riverside Dr.	Burbank	In operation	
7	5353 Van Nuys Blvd.	Van Nuys	Demolished	
8	1616 E Colorado St.	Pasadena	Demolished	
9	3130 E Colorado St.	Pasadena	Demolished	

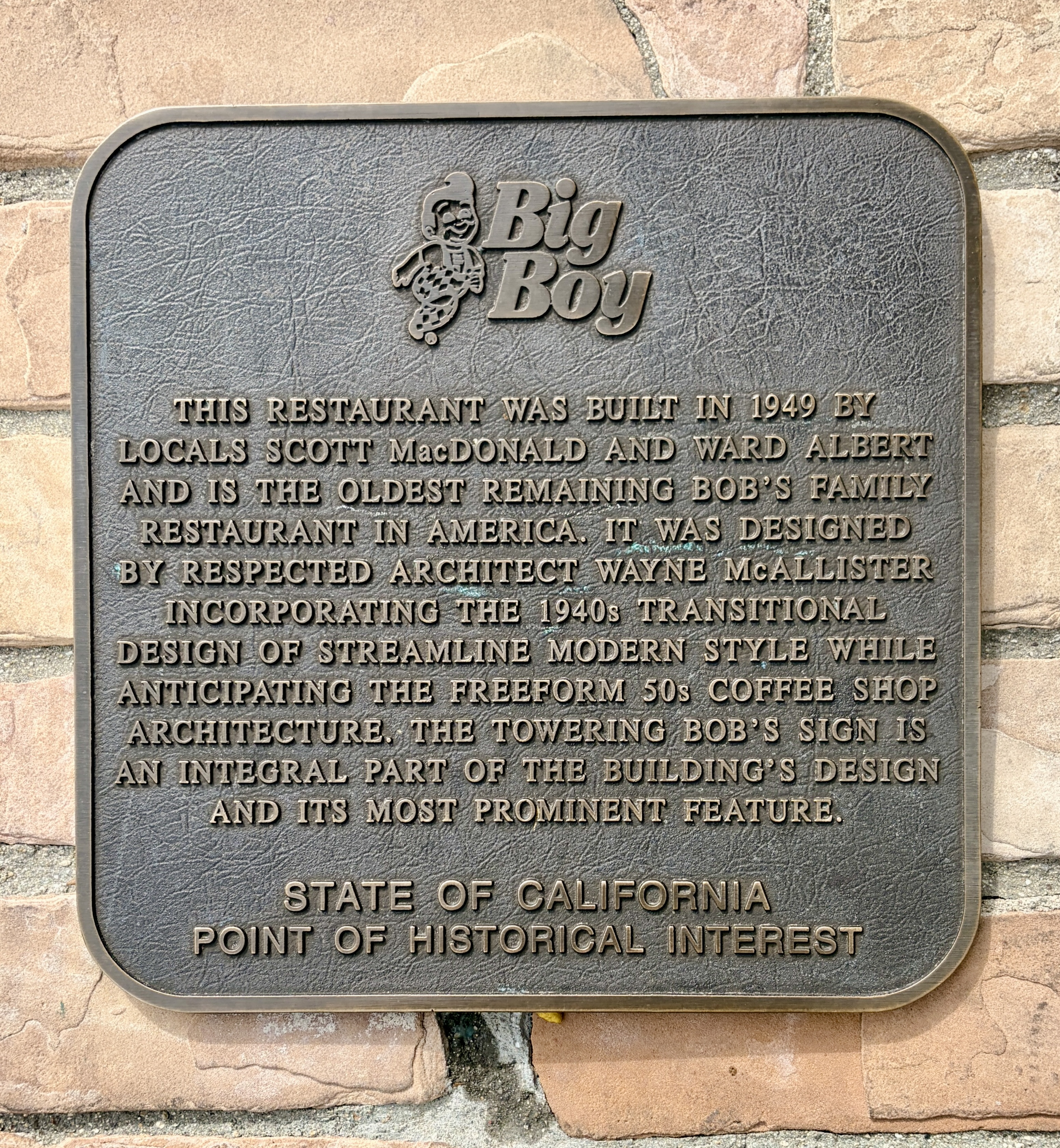
California Point of Historical Interest

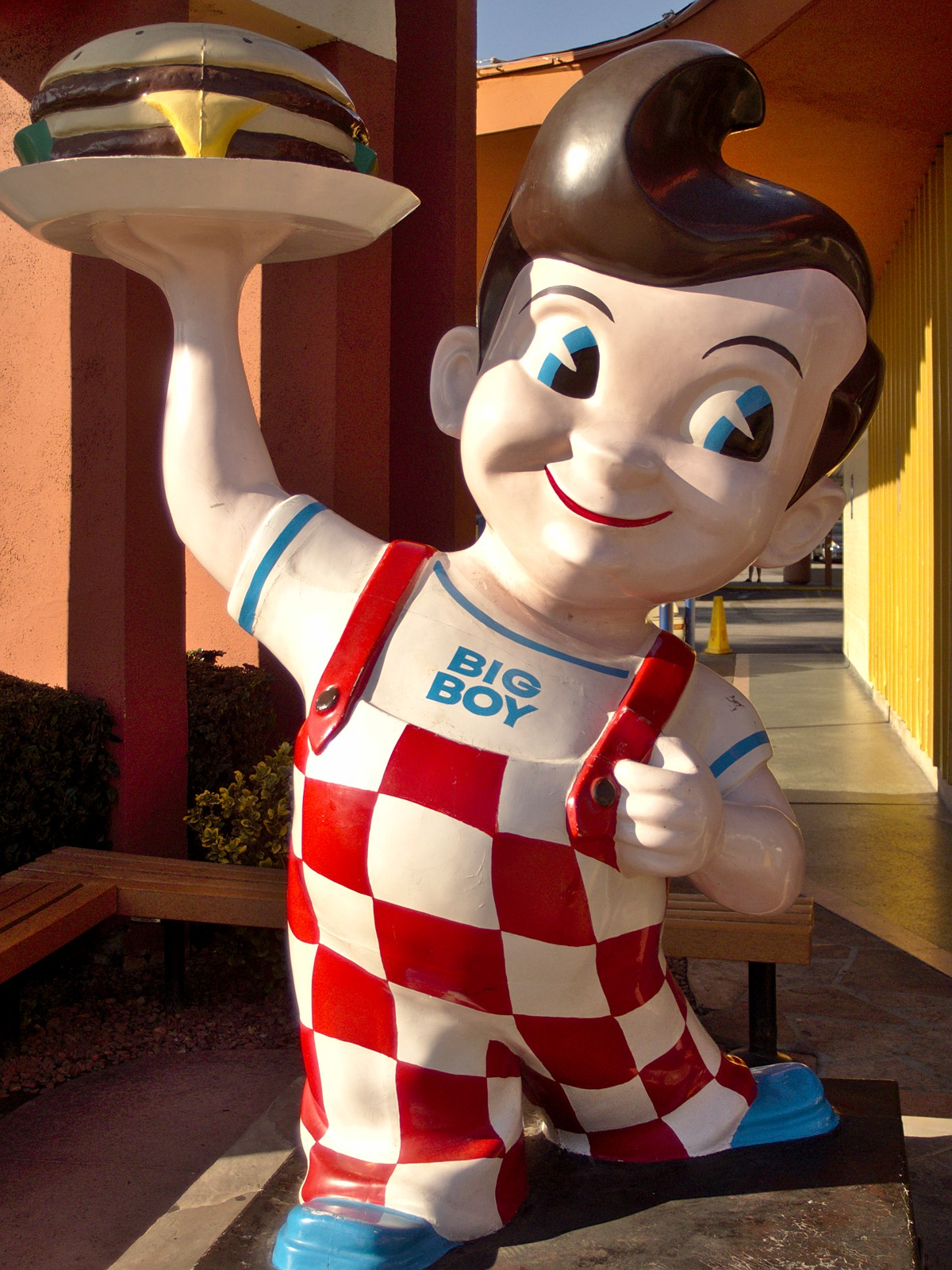
Statue in front of Bob's Big Boy restaurant in Burbank, California

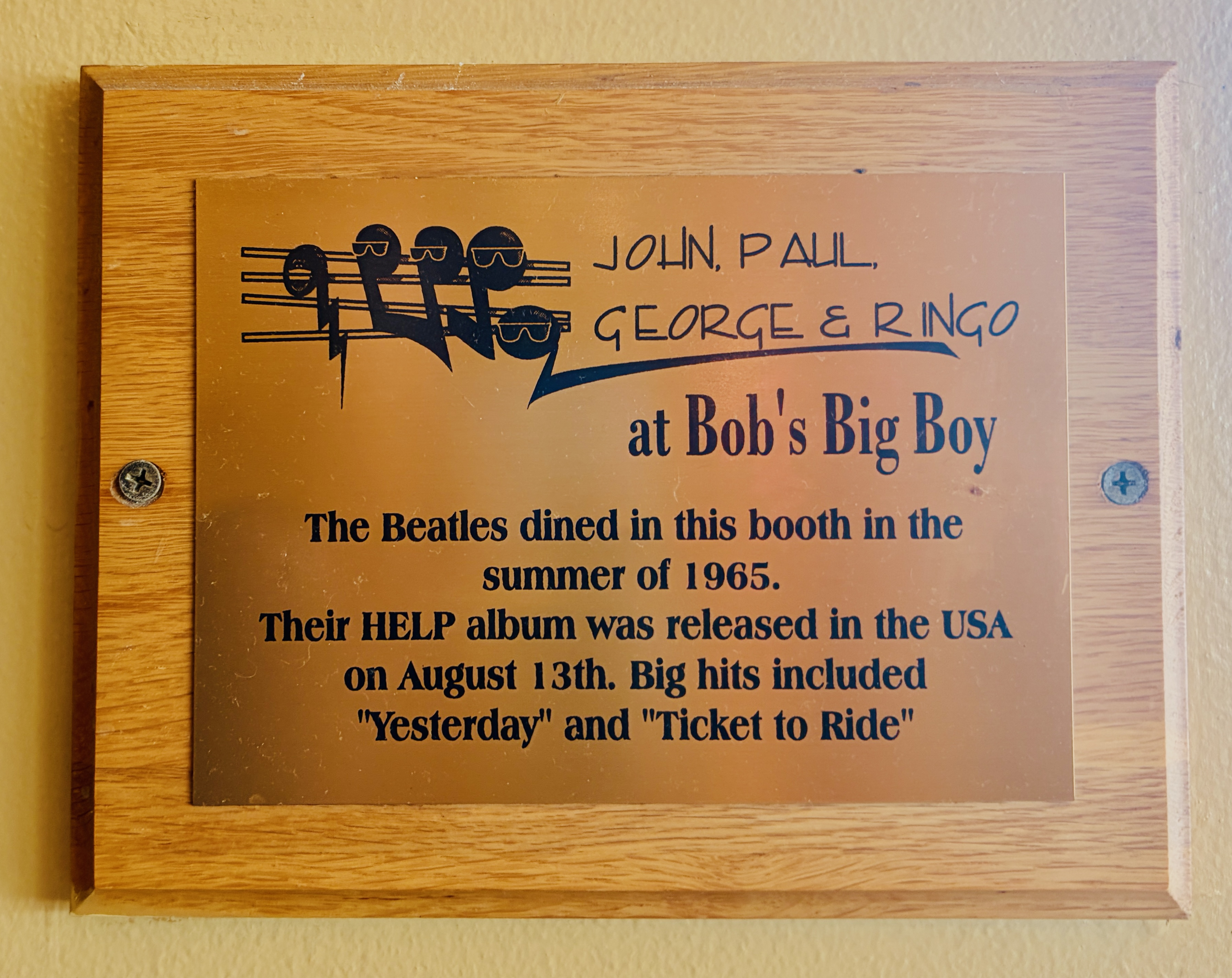
John, Paul, George & Ringo at Bob’s Big Boy (summer 1965)

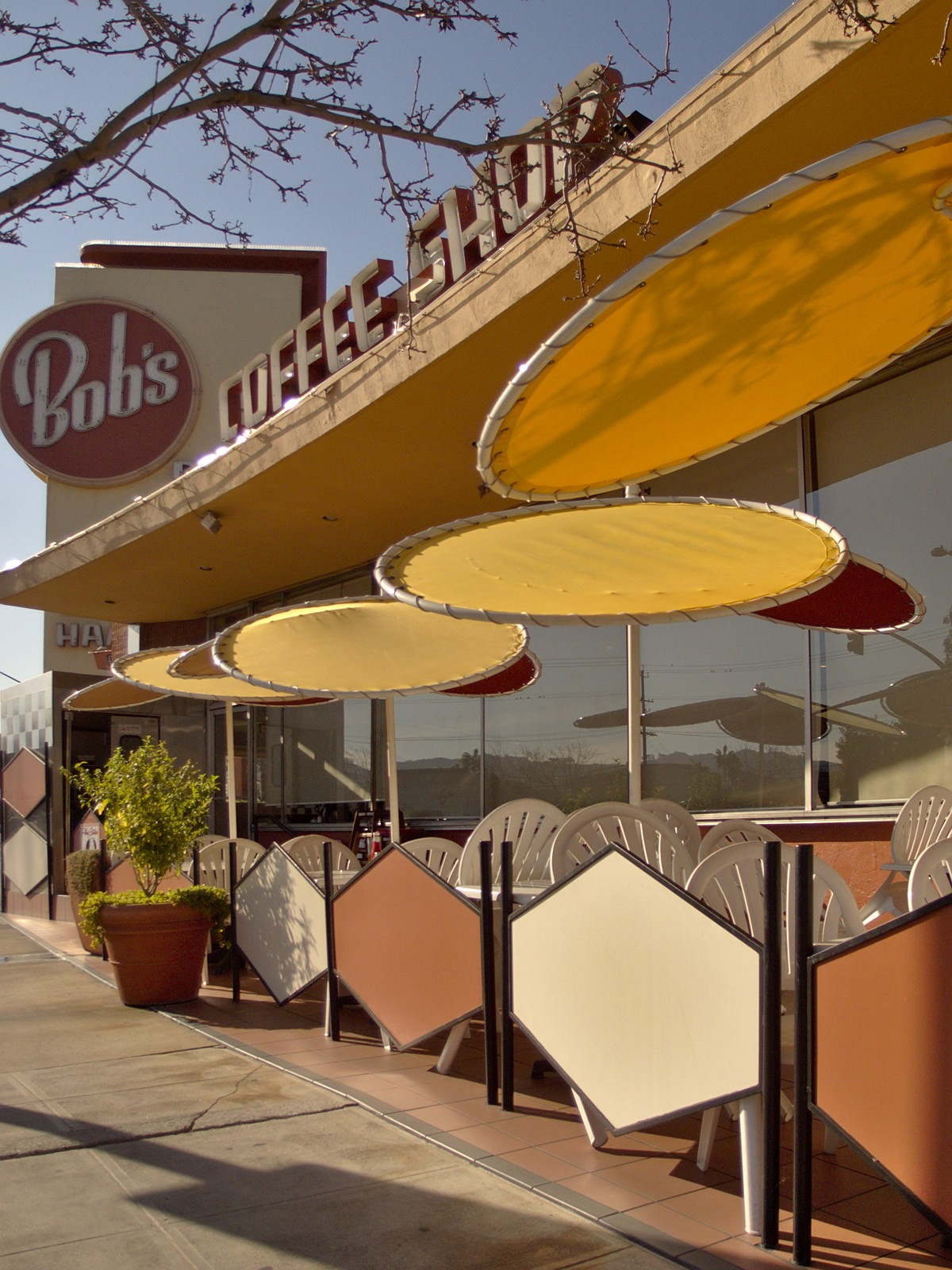
Patio tables at the Bob's Big Boy restaurant in Burbank, California

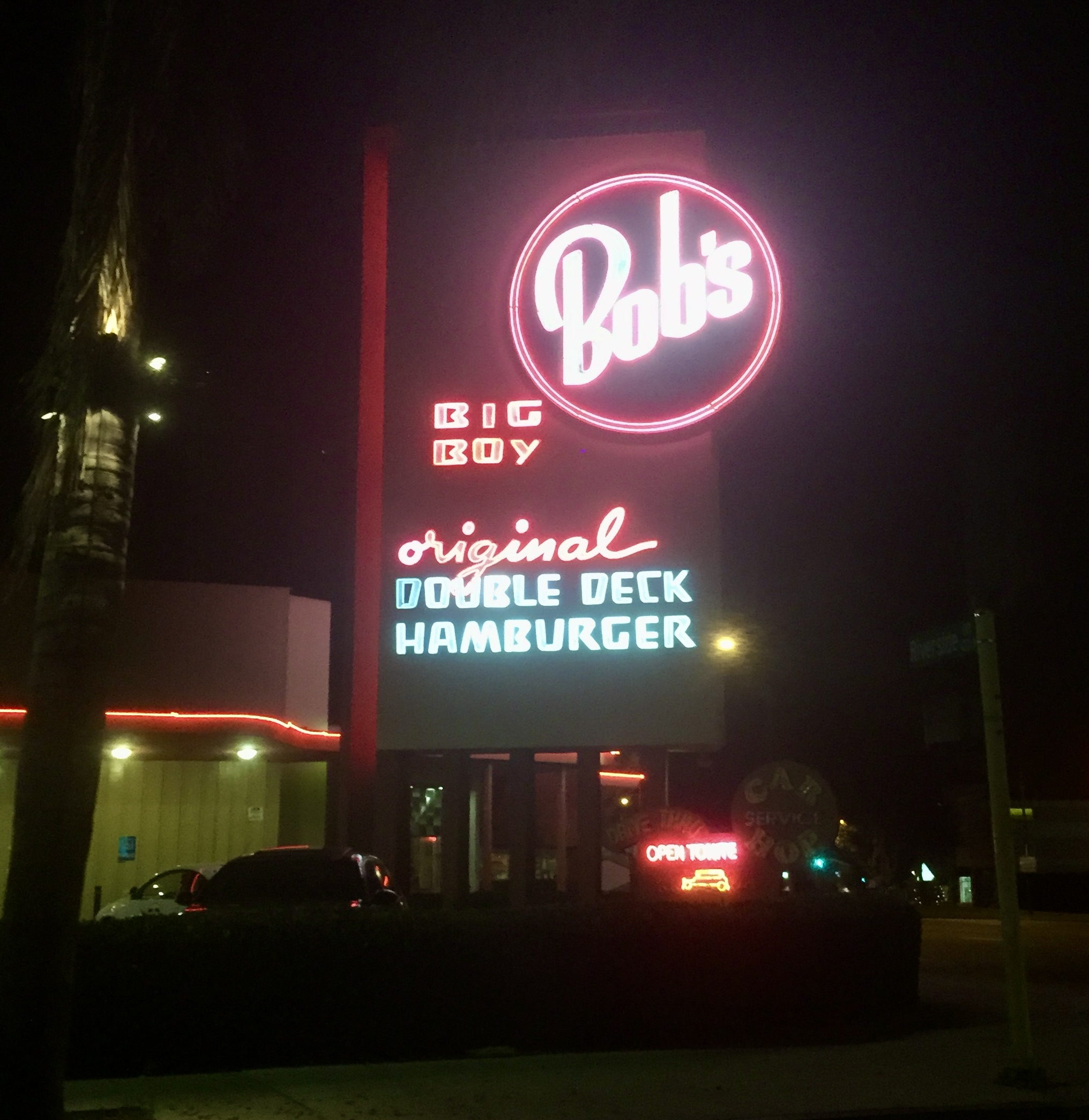
Illuminated neon sign at Bob's Big Boy in Burbank, California

The Bob's Big Boy Restaurant located at 4211 Riverside Drive in Burbank, California, is the oldest remaining Bob's Big Boy in the United States. Built in 1949 by local residents Scott MacDonald and Ward Albert, it was designed by Los Angeles architect Wayne McAllister, "incorporating the 1940s transitional design of Streamline Moderne style, while anticipating the freeform 1950s coffee shop architecture". The style's often referred to as "Googie architecture", which originated in Southern California.

The building features a curving windowed façade, expansive roof overhangs with 1950s "free-form" style of cantilevered roofs, and tall display signs. The towering Bob's sign is an integral part of the building design and its most prominent feature. The styling is said to have "made McAllister's reputation", and he is credited with creating the restaurant's circular drive-through design.

The restaurant was designated a California Point of Historical Interest in 1993. McAllister worked to preserve the structure as a historic landmark (McAllister was also the architect for the original Lawry's restaurant on La Cienega Boulevard in Beverly Hills, amongst other buildings).

The Riverside Drive venue was designed as a drive-in, in which car hops brought food to the cars, and now operates a drive-thru window. In 1993, the tower sign was renovated, the dining room updated and an outdoor dining area was added. Carhop service was reintroduced on weekends and a weekly classic car show's hosted in the parking lot.

Bob Hope and other film personalities including Mickey Rooney, Debbie Reynolds and Jonathan Winters were once regulars at the restaurant. Hope frequented the Burbank drive-in as it afforded him privacy. Director David Lynch was a regular at the location for several years, and following his death an impromptu shrine was constructed by fans at the base of the Bob's Big Boy statue.

The Beatles dined at the Burbank location during their 1965 U.S. tour. For many years, a plaque has described the event; the plaque has been stolen many times by fans, and replaced each time. Many restaurant regulars call this booth "the Beatles Booth."

This location is known as "Bob's #6".

=== Glendale ===
The original Bob's Big Boy (initially called Bob's Pantry) was the 10-stool hamburger stand in Glendale, California, which founder Bob Wian purchased in 1936 and expanded into a drive-in restaurant. It eventually outgrew itself, and was replaced by a larger Bob's restaurant similar in style to the Burbank location. The larger restaurant opened in 1956 and could accommodate 90 customers inside seated in booths and at the counter, along with a separate area to serve additional take-out patrons, while the drive-in could service 55 cars at a time. The building was designed by architects Wayne McAllister and William C. Wagner, and was one of McAllister's last designs before resigning from architecture in 1956. This location was known as "Bob's #1" and remained as a Bob's until it was closed and demolished in 1989.

A second Glendale Bob's was located at the corner of West Broadway and Orange Street. It closed and a later Bob's Coffee Shop was opened about two blocks away on the ground floor of a building located at the northwest corner of East Broadway and Maryland Avenue. This location was known as "Bob's #4". Another Bob's Big Boy operated at 3212 La Crescenta Avenue in northern Glendale near the La Crescenta-Montrose community. There was also the Glenoaks Big Boy at 1407 Glenoaks that served the Brand Park neighborhood.

=== Other locations ===
The first Phoenix, Arizona, Bob's Big Boy, established in 1954, was an exception to the California-based architecture. Located at Central Avenue and Thomas Road, the building employed horizontal overhanging roof lines and native stone at the entrance. Above was a large mural that resembled a Hopi sand painting of kachinas and a covered area to the east of the building for carhop service.

Bob's Big Boy Broiler in Downey, California, was once known as Johnie's Broiler. Also of Googie styling, the demolished structure was rebuilt based on the initial floor plan, and features carhop service, a drive-thru, and an original neon sign. It re-opened in 2009 as a Bob's Big Boy.

A Bob's Big Boy restaurant was also located in Calimesa, California, until it was closed in 2020 due to the COVID-19 pandemic.

On November 8, 2020, a franchised Big Boy opened in the Terrible's Casino in Indian Springs, Nevada. Initially referred to as a Bob's Big Boy, the restaurant opened as Big Boy without the Bob's branding. Operator Terrible Herbst plans further expansion in Nevada.

== Robbery ==
On December 14, 1980, 11 people were forced into the walk-in freezer at the West Los Angeles location on La Cienega Boulevard, robbed of approximately $1700, and shot. Three victims died at the scene, another dying five months later, and four others were wounded. Carletha Stewart, a former employee, and her accomplices, Franklin Freeman and Ricardo Sanders, were arrested in 1981, and convicted in 1982. Sanders was sentenced to death, while Stewart and Freeman were given life sentences with and without parole respectively. The crime motivated Jeffrey Bloom to write the 1986 TV movie The Right of the People which raised issues about the Second Amendment right to bear arms, right-to-carry laws, and defensive gun use.
