= Shirley's Tippy Canoe =

Defunct restaurant in Troutdale, Oregon, U.S.

- Interactive map of Shirley's Tippy Canoe

Restaurant information
- Location: 28242 E Historic Columbia River Hwy., Troutdale, Oregon, 97060, United States
- Coordinates: 45°30′59″N 122°22′10″W

Shirley's Tippy Canoe was a restaurant in Troutdale, Oregon. A fire forced the restaurant to close permanently in 2020, and the property was subsequently purchased by the owners of Sugarpine Drive-In.

== Description ==
The interior had wood panelling and an "old-school Native American motif". According to Eater Portland's Brooke Jackson-Glidden, the restaurant served casual bar food.

== History ==
The restaurant was fined by the Oregon Department of Environmental Quality in 2012. Guy Fieri visited for a 2013 episode of the Food Network series Diners, Drive-Ins and Dives. Shirley's Tippy Canoe burned down in 2020, and the property was purchased by the owners of Sugarpine Drive-In.

== See also ==
- List of defunct restaurants of the United States
- List of Diners, Drive-Ins and Dives episodes
