= Circus Drive-In =

Fast food restaurant in New Jersey, US

Coordinates: 40°09′40″N 74°03′08″W

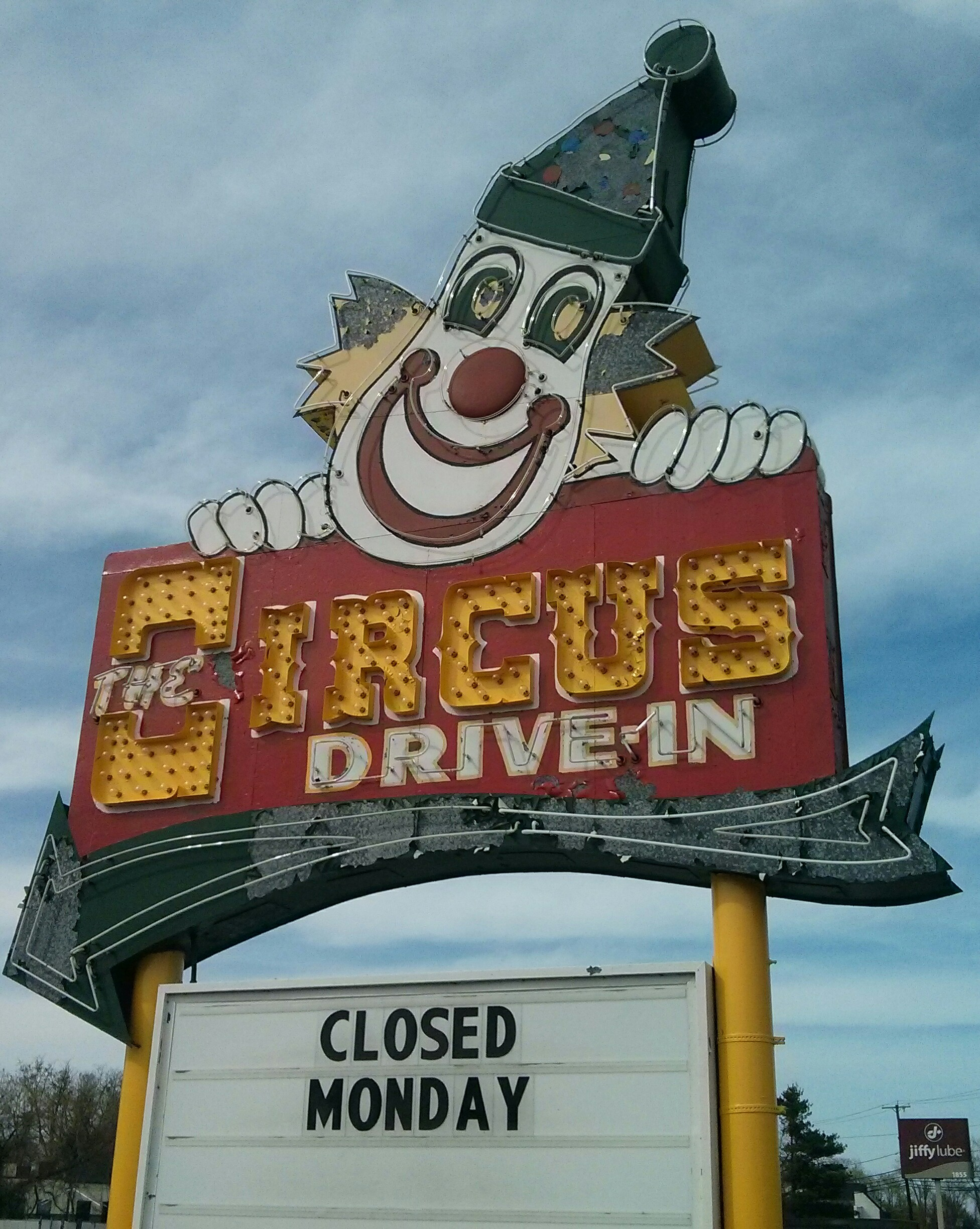

Restaurant information
- Established: 1954
- Closed: 2017
- Previous owners: Richard and Barbara Friedel; William Kayal; David Kayal; Rich Rose and Chuck Kavitsky
- Food type: Drive-in restaurant: Fast food (including hamburgers, french fries, and milkshakes)
- Location: 1861 Route 35, Wall Township, New Jersey, USA
- Seating capacity: 100, plus 100 on patio
- Website: www.circusdrivein.com

The Circus Drive-In was a fast food hamburger drive-in restaurant on Route 35 in Wall Township, New Jersey, open in the summer season. It opened in 1954 and closed in 2017.

== History ==
Circus Drive-In was opened in 1954 by Richard and Barbara Friedel. In 2004, the Friedels sold the restaurant to William Kayal; Kayal's son David Kayal became majority owner in 2010 and operated it until 2010, when he sold it to Rich Rose and Chuck Kavitsky. Rose renovated the restaurant.

Rose and Kavitsky offered the property for sale or lease in early 2017. One offer to purchase was from PETA, who proposed converting it into a vegan restaurant and museum of animal cruelty. It was sold to a buyer who closed down the business. The building was demolished in May 2018, and the neon sign, featuring a smiling clown and designed by Barbara Friedel, was removed in 2021. Wall Township placed it in storage for future display. A retail development was constructed on the site.

== Restaurant ==
The restaurant building was round, designed to resemble a circus tent, and the dining area had open sides, covered by clear plastic flaps in bad weather. Carhops brought to-go orders to customers' cars; there was a partially covered drive-in aisle. Indoor seating capacity was 100; there was also a patio seating 100, the Tiger's Den, and parking for 40 cars.

The Circus had circus-themed menu items such as the Daredevil, the Wild Animal Special, Bareback Betsy, Bozoburgers, and Sideshow hot dogs. Besides standard hamburger fare, it was known for its fried Maryland softshell crab, batter-dipped onion rings, and a newer addition of New England Lobster roll.

== In media ==
The Circus was featured in a sixth-season episode of The Secret Life Of... on the Food Network, on drive-ins.
