= Matt's Place Drive-In =

- U.S. National Register of Historic Places
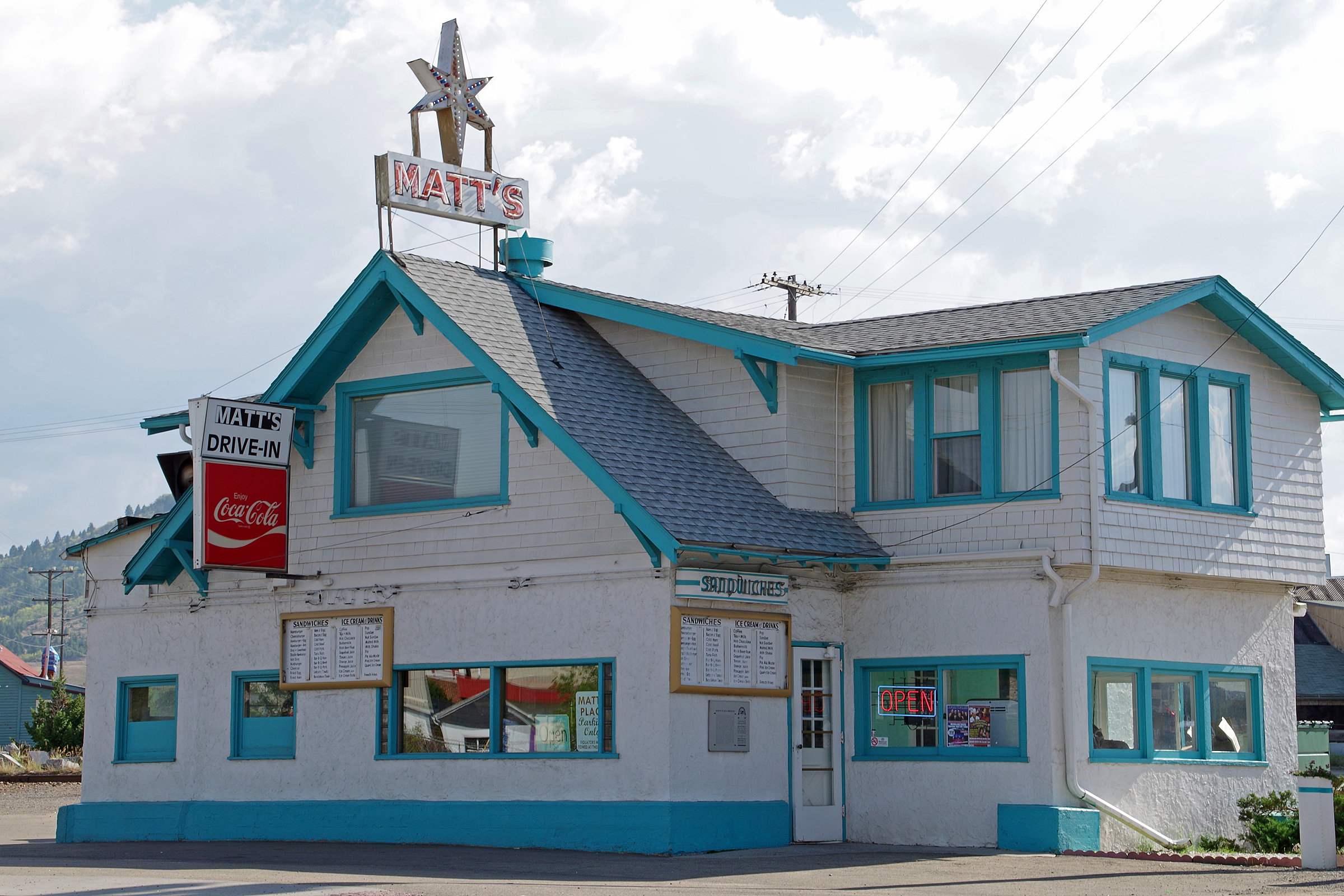

- Location within Montana Location within the United States
- Location: Butte, Montana
- Coordinates: 45°59′30″N 112°32′18″W
- Built: 1930
- Architectural style: Bungalow/Craftsman
- NRHP reference No.: 01000308
- Added to NRHP: March 29, 2001

Matt's Place Drive-In in Butte, Montana was one of the first drive-in restaurants in Montana. Unlike later drive-ins, which frequently featured a streamline moderne style, or at least an acknowledgement of their orientation to automobile-oriented customers, Matt's Place was a straightforward conversion of a house to serve customers in cars. Established in 1930, its chief concession to the automobile is a tall curb to keep parking cars from hitting the building and a menu on the outside of the building, advertising curb service. The interior retains its 1936 counter and 1950s lighting fixtures.

They were awarded the 2016 James Beard Foundation America's Classic Award.

Matt's Place closed in early 2021. In November 2025, Matt's Place re-opened under new ownership.

== See also ==
- List of drive-in restaurants
