= Mike's Drive-In =

Restaurant chain in the U.S. state of Oregon

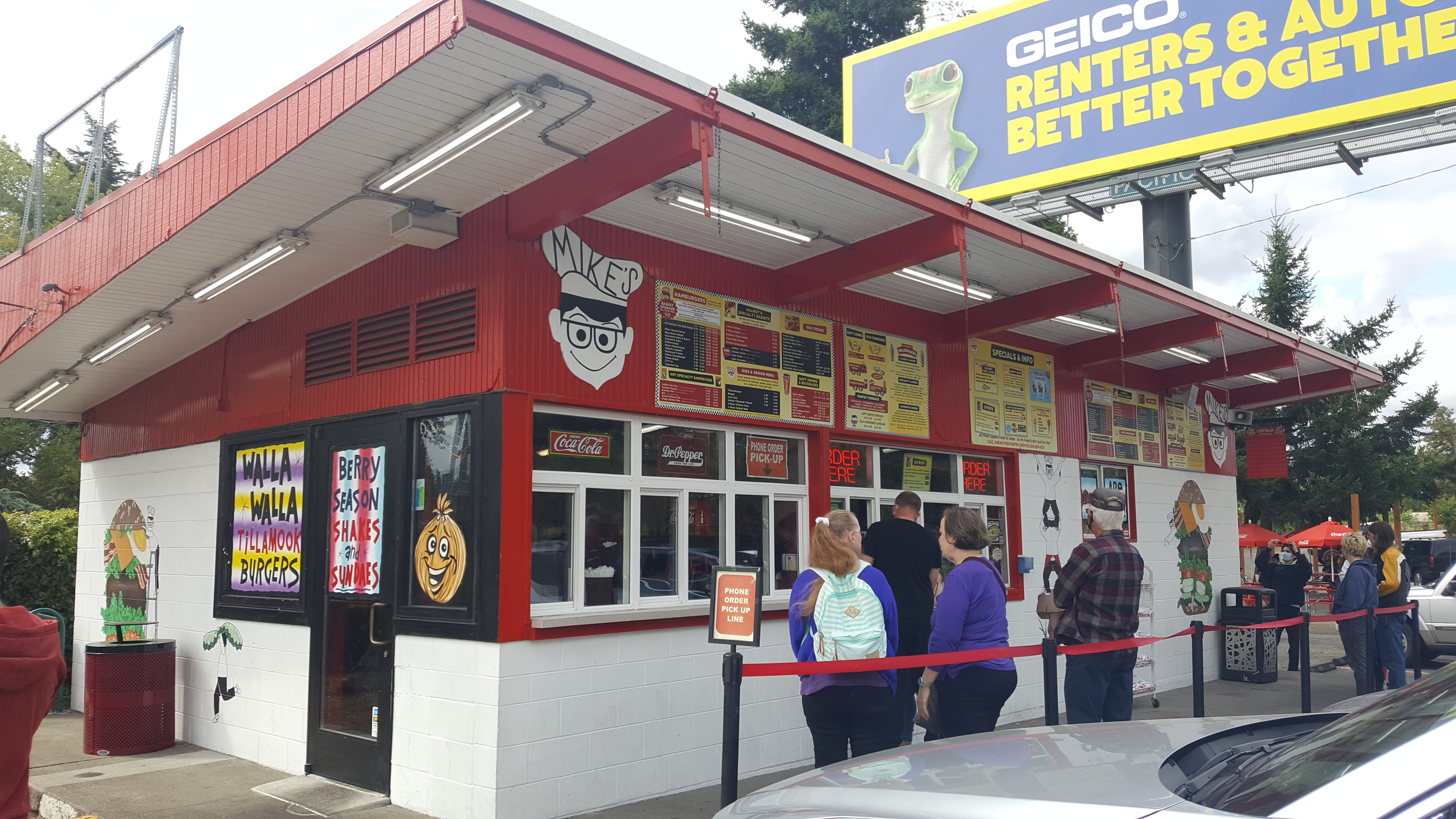
- Exterior of the restaurant in Milwaukie, Oregon, in 2021

Restaurant information
- Location: Milwaukie; Oregon City; Portland; Tigard, Oregon, United States
- Website: www.mikesdrivein.com

Mike's Drive-In is a small chain of drive-in restaurants, based in the U.S. state of Oregon. There are currently restaurants in Milwaukie, Oregon City, Tigard and most recently in North Portland; Mike's previously had a location in the Sellwood neighborhood of Portland and it has since been closed.

== History ==
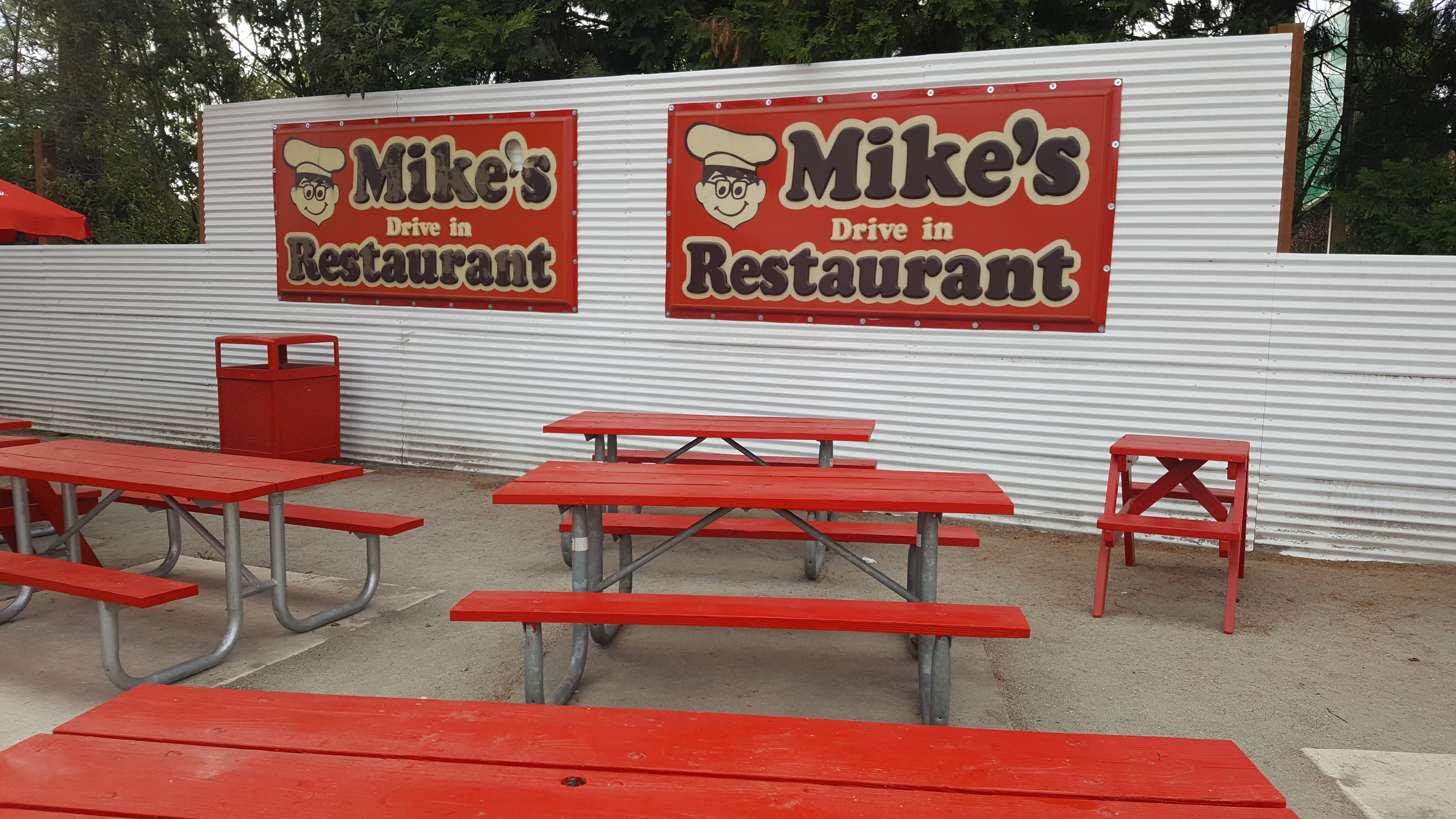
Outdoor seating at the Milwaukie restaurant, 2021

Mike Martin opened the original restaurant at the intersection of 47th Avenue and East Burnside Street in Portland in 1971, followed by the Milwaukie location in 1973. Todd Freeman purchased the business in March 1984. The Sellwood restaurant in Portland (Southeast 17th and Tenino Street) opened in 1986 and was demolished c. 2016. The Oregon City restaurant opened on August 10, 1989 and underwent a renovation in 2016.

The Milwaukie restaurant was damaged by a fire in 2020. The Milwaukie and Oregon City restaurants closed indoor dining and operated via takeout during the COVID-19 pandemic. A third location opened in Tigard in 2022 and a fourth location opened in North Portland in 2023.

== Reception ==
Michael Russell ranked Mike's number 4 on The Oregonian's 2011 list of the Portland metropolitan area's best "classic" burgers. In 2020, Portland Monthly writers ranked Mike's and other "old school" restaurants number 16 on a list of Portland's 20 best cheeseburgers. Brooke Jackson-Glidden and Alex Frane of Eater Portland have described Mike's as "an iconic Oregon restaurant for burgers, fries and soft serve".

== See also ==
- List of drive-in restaurants
- List of restaurant chains in the United States
