= Mug-n-Bun =

Restaurant in Speedway, Indiana, US

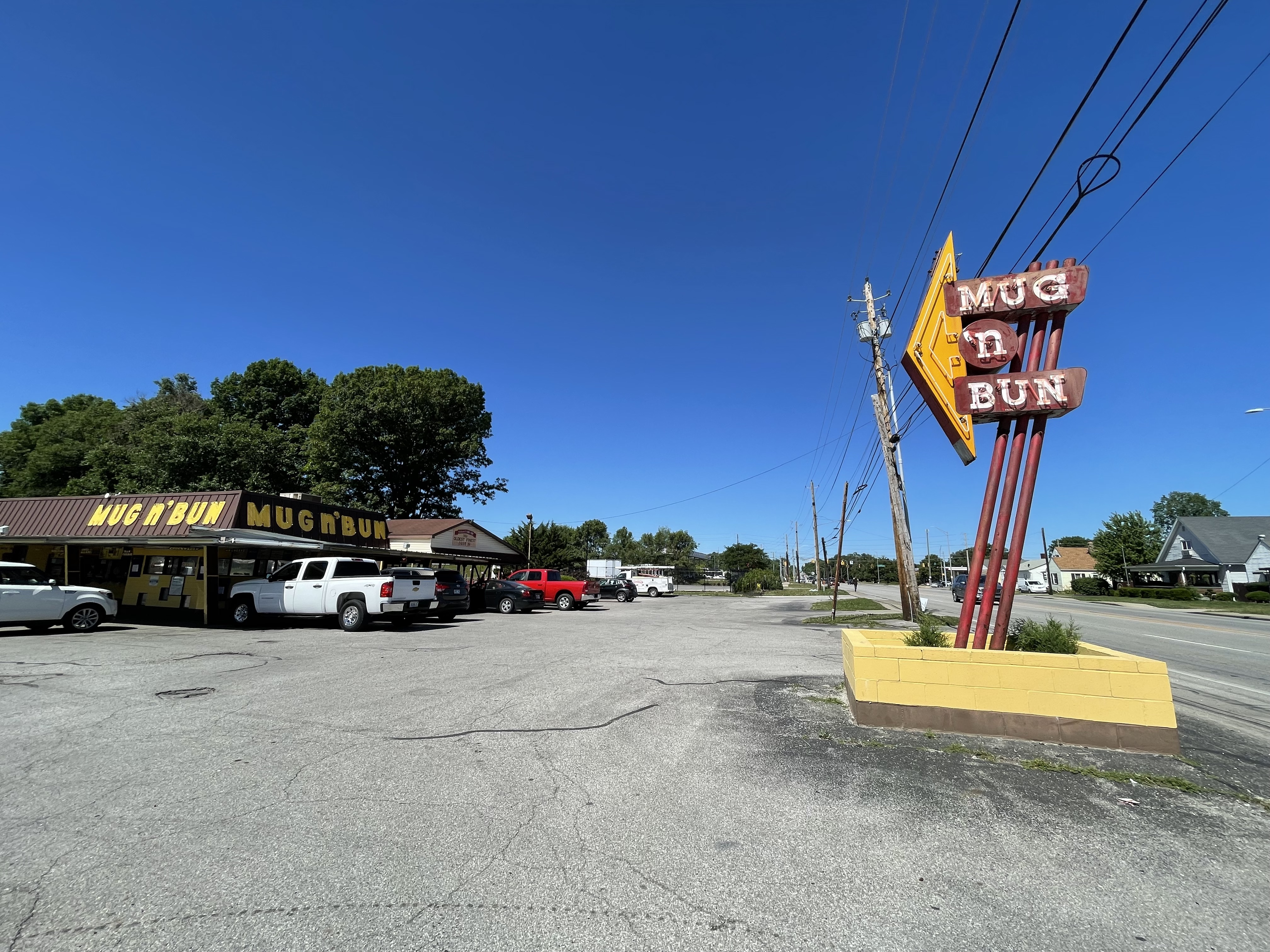
- Mug-n-Bun in 2022
- Interactive map of Mug-n-Bun

Restaurant information
- Established: 1960; 66 years ago
- Owner: Jay Watson
- Food type: American
- Location: 5211 W. 10th St., Speedway, Marion, Indiana, 46224, U.S.
- Coordinates: 39.7797°N 86.2488°W
- Seating capacity: 162 seats and 48 parking spaces
- Website: mug-n-bun.com

Mug-n-Bun is a drive-in restaurant in Speedway, Indiana, United States. Founded in 1960, Mug-n-Bun is the oldest operating drive-in restaurant in Marion County. The drive-in also operates an onsite pizzeria behind the main restaurant.

== History ==
Mug-n-Bun opened in 1956 as Frostop drive-in. In 1960, it became Mug-n-Bun.

Mug-n-Bun is currently owned by Jay Watson, who bought it after he retired in 1998 from his career as an electrician. He bought the establishment for $1.2 million. The restaurant is generally profitable, averaging a five-digit profit annually. The majority of profits go back into property upkeep. In 2009, the restaurant generated $870,000 in income and $22,000 in profit.

Customers can eat in their cars, on the restaurant patio, or in the dining room. Customers also order food to go directly from servers. To order food in their cars from a carhop, customers drive their cars into a parking spot, turn off their cars, and turn on their car lights. Servers do not respond to honking. Customers that sit on the restaurant patio push a button at their table to place their order.

When Watson bought the restaurant, it was not open during the coldest winter months. He decided to renovate an adjacent property into a dining room for guests during the hottest and coldest days of the year. The renovation, which Watson completed himself, cost $60,000. Despite being a popular restaurant to visit during Indianapolis 500 race festivities, it is closed on the day of the race.

The restaurant was cash only for 50 years. In January 2010, Mug-n-Bun began accepting credit and debit cards. This increased sales by 10%. Servers must be tipped in cash or by Venmo or Cash App.

During the COVID-19 shutdown, Mug-n-Bun continued to offer carhop service as an essential business. Staff members wore face masks, no longer offered beverage refills, and stopped attaching food trays to car windows.

In January 2023, Watson announced he was selling the business, listing it for $2.1 million.

== Cuisine ==
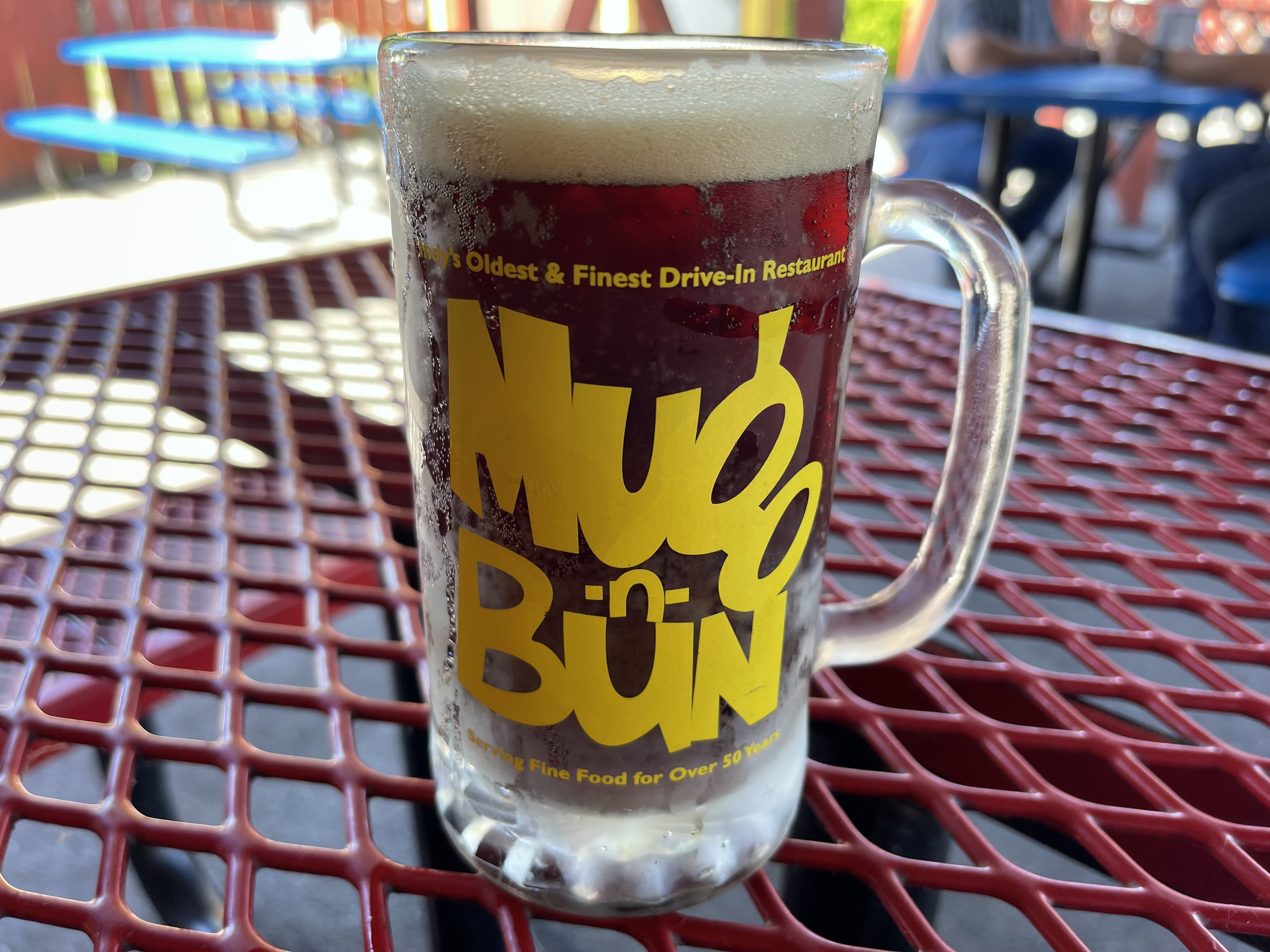
A glass of Mug-n-Bun rootbeer

Mug-n-Bun serves Midwestern staples and classic American diner food. The most popular items are their pork tenderloin sandwich, their hand-cut, hand-dipped onion rings, and their homemade root beer. The drive-in also serves hamburgers, fried shrimp and catfish, fried chicken, coney dogs, french fries, fried pickles, corn nuggets, ice cream floats, and milkshakes. Mug-n-Bun also operates Mug-n-Bun Pizza, which is located behind the drive-in. In addition to pizza, it also serves fried chicken dinners.

The $4 pork tenderloin sandwich is a one-pound pork tenderloin pounded thin and served on a small hamburger bun with pickles and mustard. Guests wanting lettuce, tomato, or other condiments must pay a "Hoosier Tax" for the extra fixings.

The root beer is made on-site and has hints of vanilla. Jim Webster of the Washington Post described it as "smooth, flavorful, and not overly sweet." Quart sizes of the root beer come in souvenir plastic cups.

== Reception ==
Mug-n-Bun was named one of the most essential restaurants to eat at in Indianapolis by Thrillist in 2015.

Mug-n-Bun Pizza was named one of the top restaurants in Speedway in 2018 by the Indianapolis Star. That same year, the newspaper also called the drive-in's root beer and onion rings two of the most "iconic foods" of the Indianapolis 500. The Chicago Tribune described Mug-n-Bun as iconic and a "less expensive but no less tasty choice" than other famous Indianapolis restaurant St. Elmo Steak House.

In 2018, Mug-n-Bun was featured on Man v. Food, during which star Casey Webb attempted to eat the restaurant's famous pork tenderloin. He failed to do so, unable to finish the sandwich by the allotted time.

Famous customers include Jimmy Fallon and the Andretti family.
