= Superdawg =

- Superdawg in 2026
- Interactive map of Superdawg

Restaurant information
- Established: May 1948
- Owner: Berman family
- Food type: Hot dog stand with carhop service
- Location: 6363 N. Milwaukee Avenue, Chicago, Illinois, 60646, United States
- Coordinates: 41°59′48″N 87°47′13″W
- Other locations: 333 S. Milwaukee Avenue, Wheeling, IL 60090
- Website: superdawg.com

Superdawg is a drive-in hot dog stand with carhop service. It is located in the Norwood Park neighborhood of Chicago, at the intersection of Milwaukee, Devon, and Nagle avenues. Superdawg has the distinction of being one of the few original drive-in restaurants left in the United States. Its methods have been the same since it opened in 1948. A second location on Milwaukee Avenue in Wheeling, Illinois, opened in 2010.

Superdawg was featured on the Food Network's television programs Unwrapped and Emeril Live, and on the PBS television programs Check, Please! and A Hot Dog Program. It has been visited by many critics and food aficionados. It is listed in the books 1,000 Places to See Before You Die and Hot Dog Chicago: A Native's Dining Guide.

== History ==
Superdawg mascots Maurie and Flaurie

Superdawg was opened in May 1948 by Maurie and Flaurie Berman, and it is still owned and operated by their family. Although the restaurant has undergone some expansion and remodeling, the landmark figures of anthropomorphic hot dogs "Maurie and Flaurie" on the roof date from the beginning.

A Superdawg location in Midway Airport's B concourse operated from 2003 to 2010. Another Superdawg restaurant opened on Milwaukee Avenue in Wheeling, Illinois, in 2010.

Superdawg has succeeded in asking a number of restaurants to cease using similar names, and successfully sued a New York City hot dog eatery named Superdog when it refused to comply. The Superdawg trademark was registered in 1984.

In 2014, Superdawg collaborated with Lake Effect Brewing Company, a Chicago craft brewery, to create a lager-style beer called Super Bier.

Maurie Berman died on May 17, 2015. His wife Flaurie died May 1, 2018.

In June 2015, the Unicode Consortium added a hot dog to the list of officially recognized emoji. In September 2015, Apple made the symbol available on its phones and computers with the release of the iOS 9 operating system. Superdawg was a leader in the effort to establish the hot dog emoji.

== Carhop service ==
The restaurant retains a 1950s style of ordering food. Customers pull their car up to one of the carports and order through a metallic speaker box. Each cashier responds to the customer's call through the speaker box with the greeting, "Hiya, thanks for stopping. May I take your order, please?" The orders are delivered to the car window by a carhop with a tray that hooks on to the half-open car window. When finished eating, the customer flips a switch on the box and a carhop comes to take the tray back. There is also a walkup window and there are a few tables and benches outside the restaurant. The Wheeling location has a large indoor seating area.

== The food ==
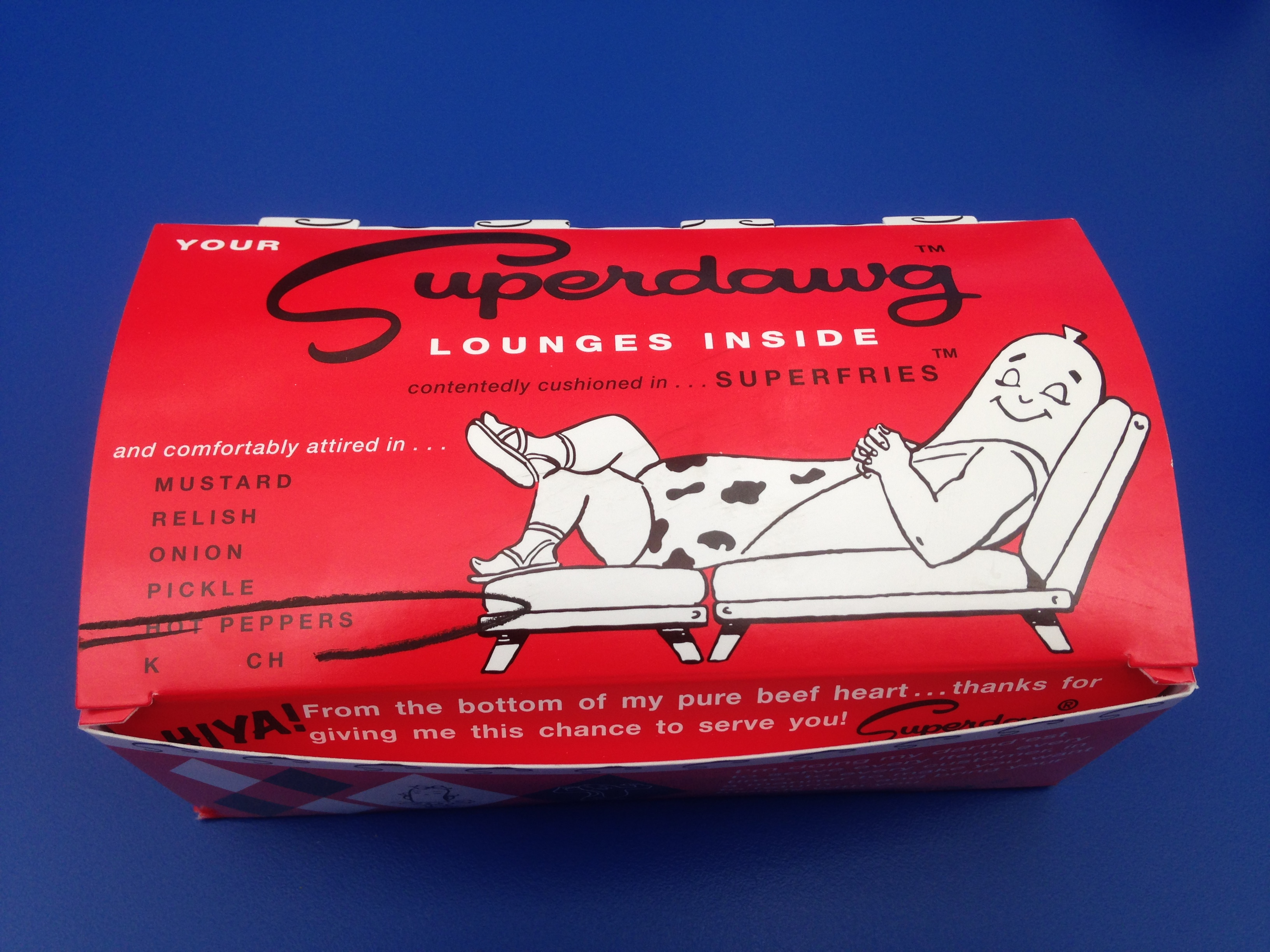
The hot dog and French fries are served together in a distinctive cardboard box.

The restaurant makes a distinction between their hot dog and a regular red hot as it says on their menu, "not a red hot- not a frankfurter - not a wiener - but our exclusive... Superdawg." The Superdawg is made with a larger wiener than other Chicago-style hot dogs, and comes with a signature pickled green tomato and crinkle cut fries. Superdawg also sells double-cheeseburgers called "Whoopercheesies" and diced ice cream.

== See also ==
- Chicago-style hot dog
- List of drive-in restaurants
