= Ivanhoe's Restaurant =

Restaurant in Upland, Indiana, United States

Coordinates: 40.465844°N 85.494102°W

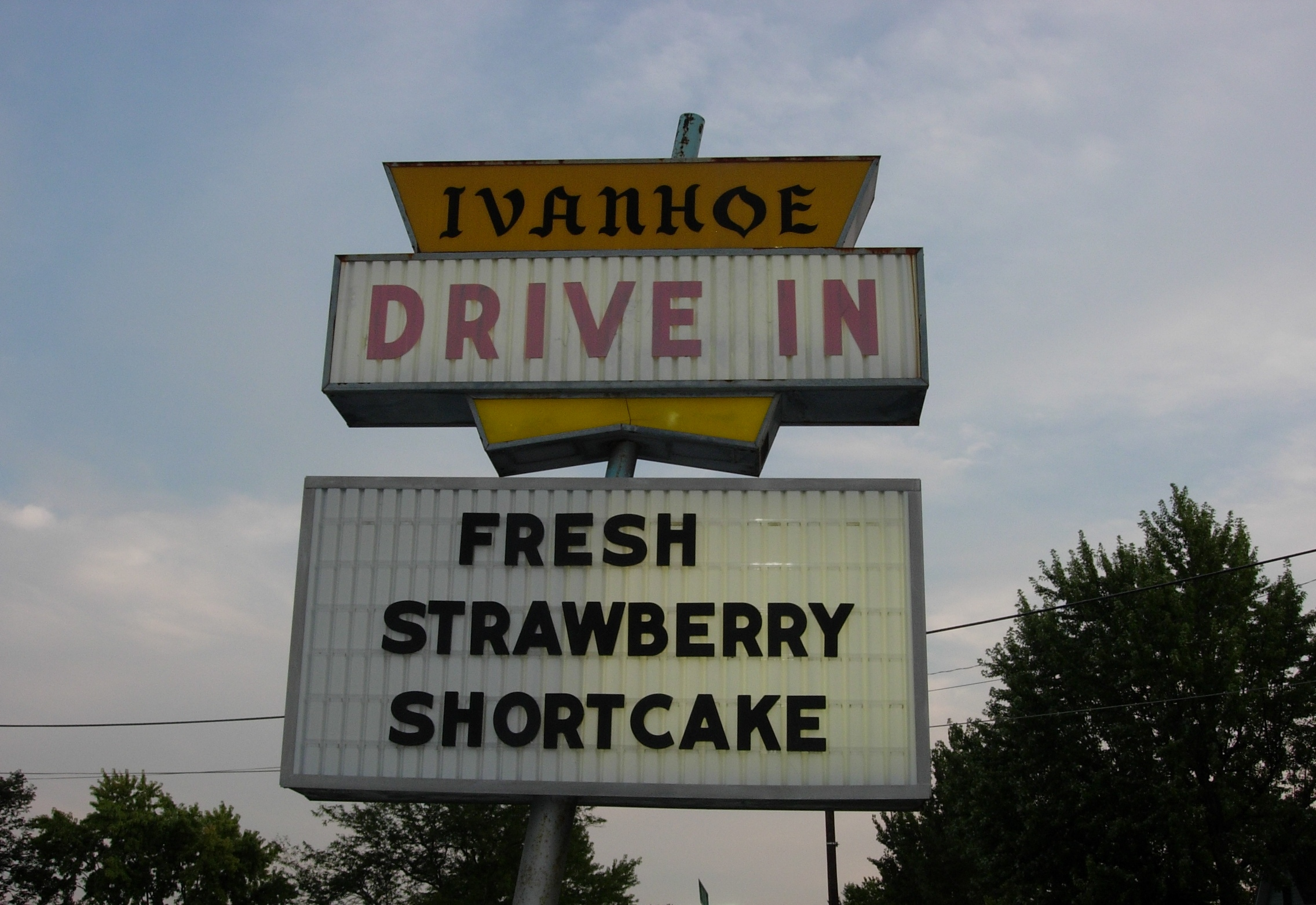
- Company type: Private
- Industry: Diner
- Founded: 1965
- Headquarters: 979 S Main St, Upland, Indiana 46989, USA
- Area served: Grant County, Indiana
- Website: Ivanhoe's

Ivanhoe's Restaurant is located in Upland, Indiana near the campus of Taylor University.

Founded in 1965, the restaurant has been a hangout for generations of students and has been featured in travel magazines as well as statewide and local newspaper articles.

Ivanhoe's is known for its selection of 100 different sundaes and shakes, and the menu also includes hamburgers, salads, pork tenderloins, and hot dogs.

== See also ==
- List of drive-in restaurants
