= Frostie Root Beer =

American brand of root beer

- Manufacturer: Intrastate Distributors Inc.
- Origin: United States
- Introduced: 1939
- Color: Caramel
- Variants: Frostie Diet Root Beer; Frostie Vanilla Root Beer; Frostie Blue Cream Soda; Frostie Cherry Limeade; Frostie Concord Grape; Frostie Orange; Frostie Pink Lemonade; Frostie Strawberry Watermelon; Frostie Green Apple
- Website: www.frostie.biz

Frostie Root Beer
- Type: Subsidiary
- Industry: Beverage
- Headquarters: Detroit, MI, USA
- Area served: USA
- Website: http://www.frostie.biz/

Frostie Root Beer is an American brand of root beer that was originally produced in 1939 by The Frostie Beverage Company of Catonsville, Maryland, owned by George Rackensperger. In 1971, Frostie Enterprises, as the parent company was known, purchased a competing rootbeer brand and drive-in chain, Stewart's Restaurants (sold in 1979). Another expansion happened in 1974, when Frostie Enterprises purchased the Dog n Suds Root Beer Drive-in and brand.

At the end of 1979, the Frostie brand was sold to the Monarch Beverage Company of Atlanta, Georgia. After years of being under-promoted by Monarch in favor of Dad's Root Beer, the Frostie brand was sold in 2000 to Leading Edge Brands of Temple, Texas. In 2009, Leading Edge Brands sold the Frostie line of beverages to Intrastate Distributors Inc. of Detroit, Michigan. As of 2014 it is now distributed by Excel Bottling Company of Breese, Illinois.

== Flavors ==
The Frostie line includes the following sixteen flavors:

- Root Beer
- [Diet] Root Beer
- Vanilla Root Beer
- Ginger Beer
- Ginger Ale
- Blue Cream Soda
- Green Apple
- Orange
- Concord Grape
- Cherry Limeade
- Strawberry
- Strawberry Watermelon

== Lemonades ==
- Classic Lemonade
- Blue Lemonade
- Pink Lemonade
- Strawberry Lemonade
- Watermelon Lemonade

== See also ==
- Dog n Suds
- Stewart's Restaurants
