= Stewart's Restaurants =

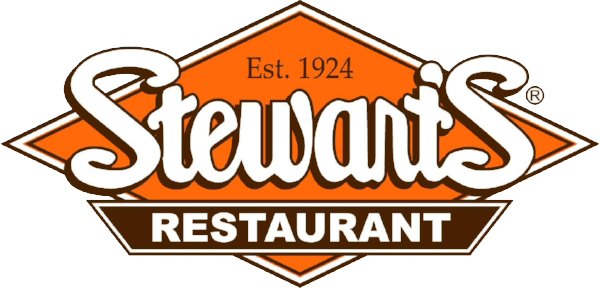

Restaurant information
- Established: 1924; 102 years ago
- Food type: Bar
- Dress code: Casual
- Location: United States

Stewart's Restaurants are classic 1950s style fast-food restaurants located throughout the United States. Restaurants are branded as Stewart's Root Beer or Stewart's Drive-In or similar variations. Started in 1924 in Mansfield, Ohio by Frank Stewart, the chain became a franchise in 1931.

As of 2021, there are 30 locations open in the United States, the majority of which are located in New Jersey with the rest in New York, Ohio, Pennsylvania, and West Virginia.

== Products ==
Stewart's is famous for its Stewart's Fountain Classics root beer and hot dogs, but most locations also offer hamburgers, grilled chicken sandwiches, Cheesesteaks, ice cream, and milkshakes. Root beer products can be sold as bottled or frosted mug drinks and floats. Products tend to vary from location to location, based on the type of service offered. Express locations offer a simpler menu, and full service locations offer breakfast, lunch, and dinner.

== History ==
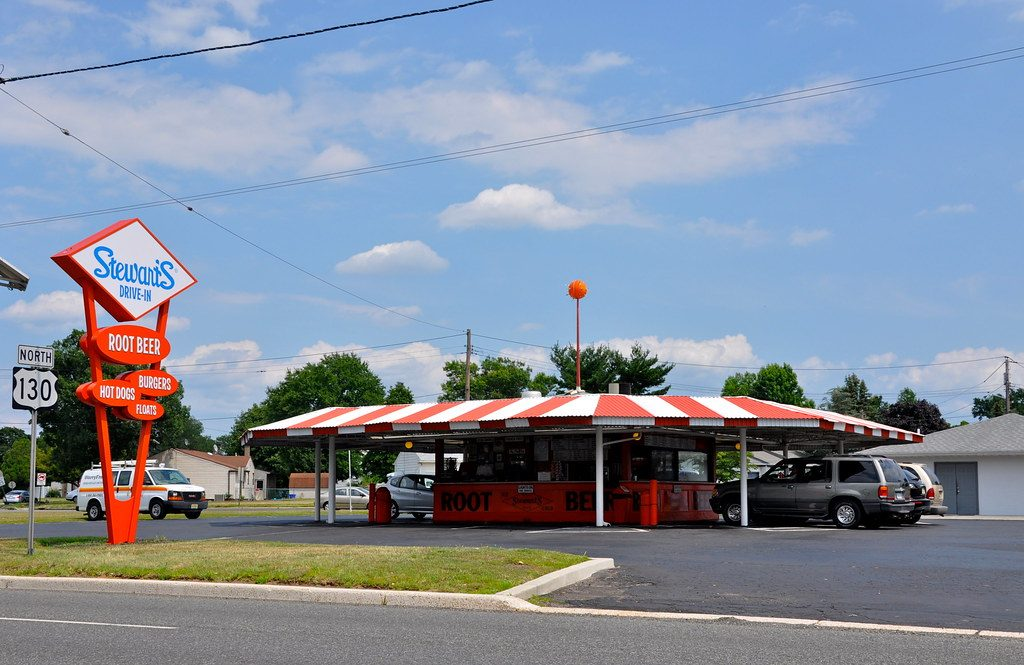
A Stewart's Drive-In in Burlington, New Jersey, which has been in seasonal operation since 1947.

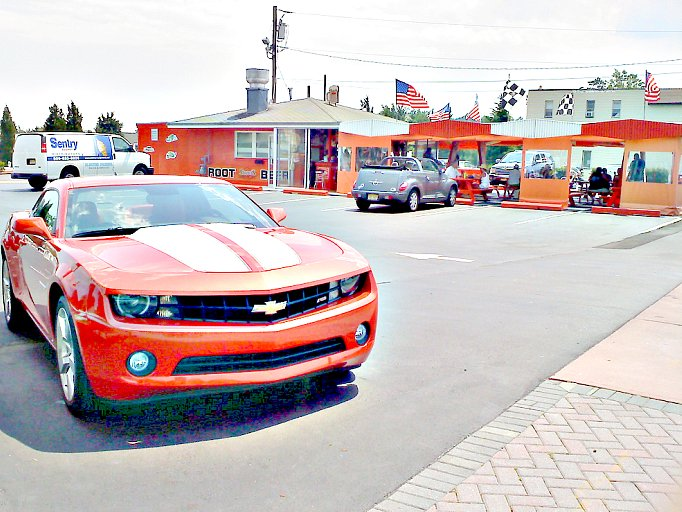
A Stewart's Drive-In in Tuckerton, New Jersey, which has been in continuous operation since the 1970s

The first Stewart's Drive-In was opened by Frank Stewart in 1924 Mansfield, Ohio. Stewart opened up a small stand to make extra money in the summer to supplement his income as a school teacher.

The restaurant was originally a West-Coast-style fast-food eatery serving only root beer and popcorn. Stewart added extra salt to his popcorn to boost his root beer sales. He opened up more locations, many of them with carhops. Stewart's #2 opened in Marion, Ohio in 1925, and is still in operation.

Entrepreneurs John and Ami Mandt helped expand the business by franchising the brand starting in 1931, and there are two such remaining locations in West Virginia. Ownership of the company was handed over to Ohio businessman Carl Ransbottom, then to businessman Raymond Beck. Carl's son, Robert E. Ransbottom continued to work under Beck, who sold the company to Frostie Enterprises in 1971, which was purchased by a company named Moxie Industries. In 1979, the company was handed over to a new company, DeNovo Corporation, which also operated Dog n Suds franchises in the Midwest. Michael W. Fessler, one of the original owners of the DeNovo Corp., still owns Stewarts Restaurants, Inc.

== See also ==
- Stewart's Fountain Classics
- List of hamburger restaurants
- List of hot dog restaurants
