= Dog n Suds =

American drive-in eatery chain

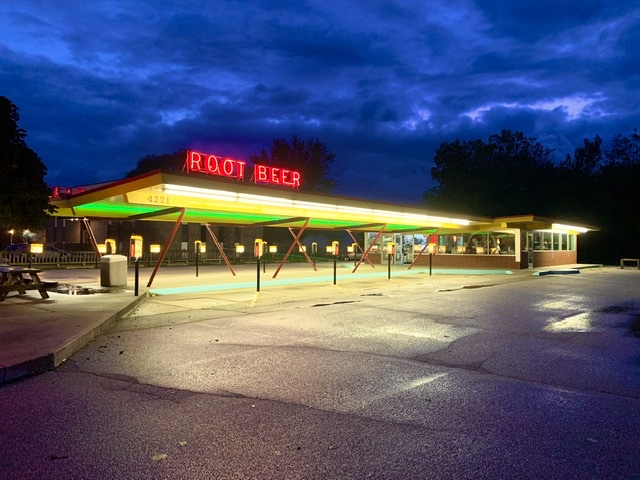
- A Dog n Suds location at night.
- Type: Drive-In
- Industry: Fast food
- Founded: 1952; 74 years ago in Champaign, Illinois
- Founders: James Griggs, Don Hamacher
- Headquarters: Lafayette, Indiana, USA
- Number of locations: 11
- Area served: Midwestern United States
- Products: Hamburgers, hot dogs, fries, root beer
- Owner: Frostie Enterprises (1974); Don and Carol VanDame (TK&C's LLC)(1991)
- Website: dognsuds.com

Dog n Suds is a midwestern United States-based chain of hot dog and root beer drive-in style eateries. The chain started in 1953; by the 1970s the franchise included over 650 restaurants across 38 states. In 2021, the brand continues to operate at approximately 20 locations; the company serves hot dogs, hamburgers, french fries and soft drinks.

== History ==
The first Dog n Suds was opened in 1953 in Champaign, Illinois by Champaign High School music teachers James Griggs and Don Hamacher. According to Hamacher, he and Griggs asked an architect to draw up plans for a building, and the architect lettered into the sign: Dog n' Suds. When Hamacher asked him about it, the architect replied: "that's what you're selling", and that is the name they went with. The second restaurant was opened after the owners were paid to build another by a wealthy patron and from there the owners decided to create a franchise. A training center was established in Champaign, named "Rover College" after the dog on the restaurant signage. At its peak in 1968, the chain had about 650 restaurants.

In the early 1970s, Griggs sold his interest in the business and a few years later in 1974 the company was sold to Frostie Enterprises who owned the Frostie and Stewart's brands of root beer.

In 1991, the VanDames purchased the Dog n Suds trademark and identity rights. In 2001, they created a new company, TK&C's LLC, to administer licensing rights for the brand.

== In popular culture ==
On March 3, 1966, the newly opened Fred's Dog n Suds at the Candlestick Park Shopping Center in Jackson, Mississippi was completely destroyed by an F5 tornado during the 1966 Candlestick Park tornado outbreak. The story was spotlighted in a 2003 Storm Stories episode by the Weather Channel.

The West Lafayette location was featured on an episode of the Big Ten Network's Campus Eats in 2018.
