= Sugarpine Drive-In =

Restaurant in Troutdale, Oregon, U.S.

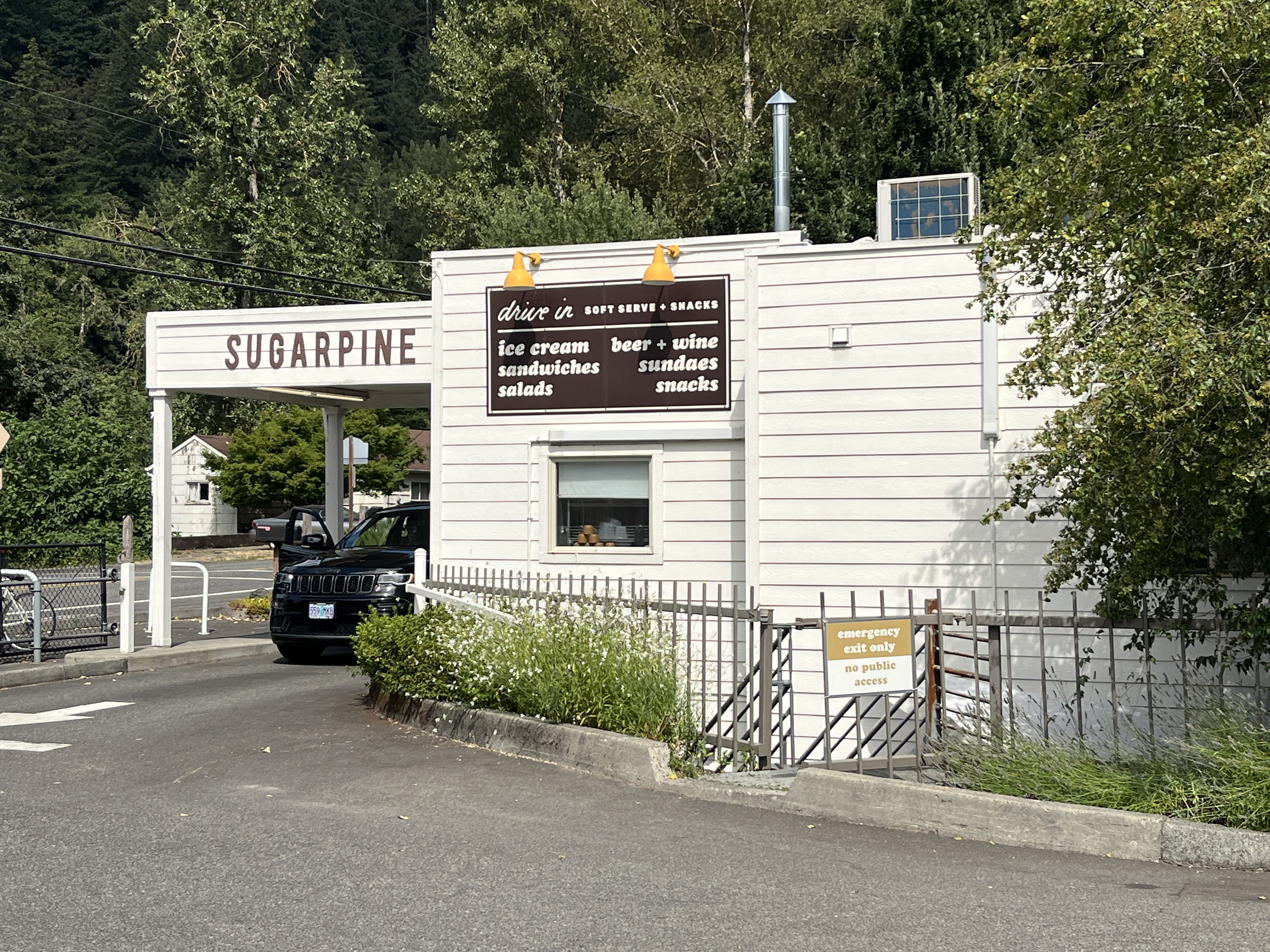
- The restaurant in 2022
- Interactive map of Sugarpine Drive-In

Restaurant information
- Location: Troutdale, Oregon, United States
- Coordinates: 45°32′16″N 122°22′40.5″W
- Website: sugarpinedrivein.com

Sugarpine Drive-In is a restaurant along the Historic Columbia River Highway in Troutdale, Oregon.

== Reception ==
KOIN included Sugarpine in a 2023 list of the Portland metropolitan area's top ten ice cream shops, based on Yelp reviews for business with no more than three locations. Anastasia Sloan included the business in Eater Portland's 2025 overview of the city's best dairy-free frozen desserts.

== See also ==
- List of drive-in restaurants
