= Carhop =

Waiter or waitress at drive-in restaurants

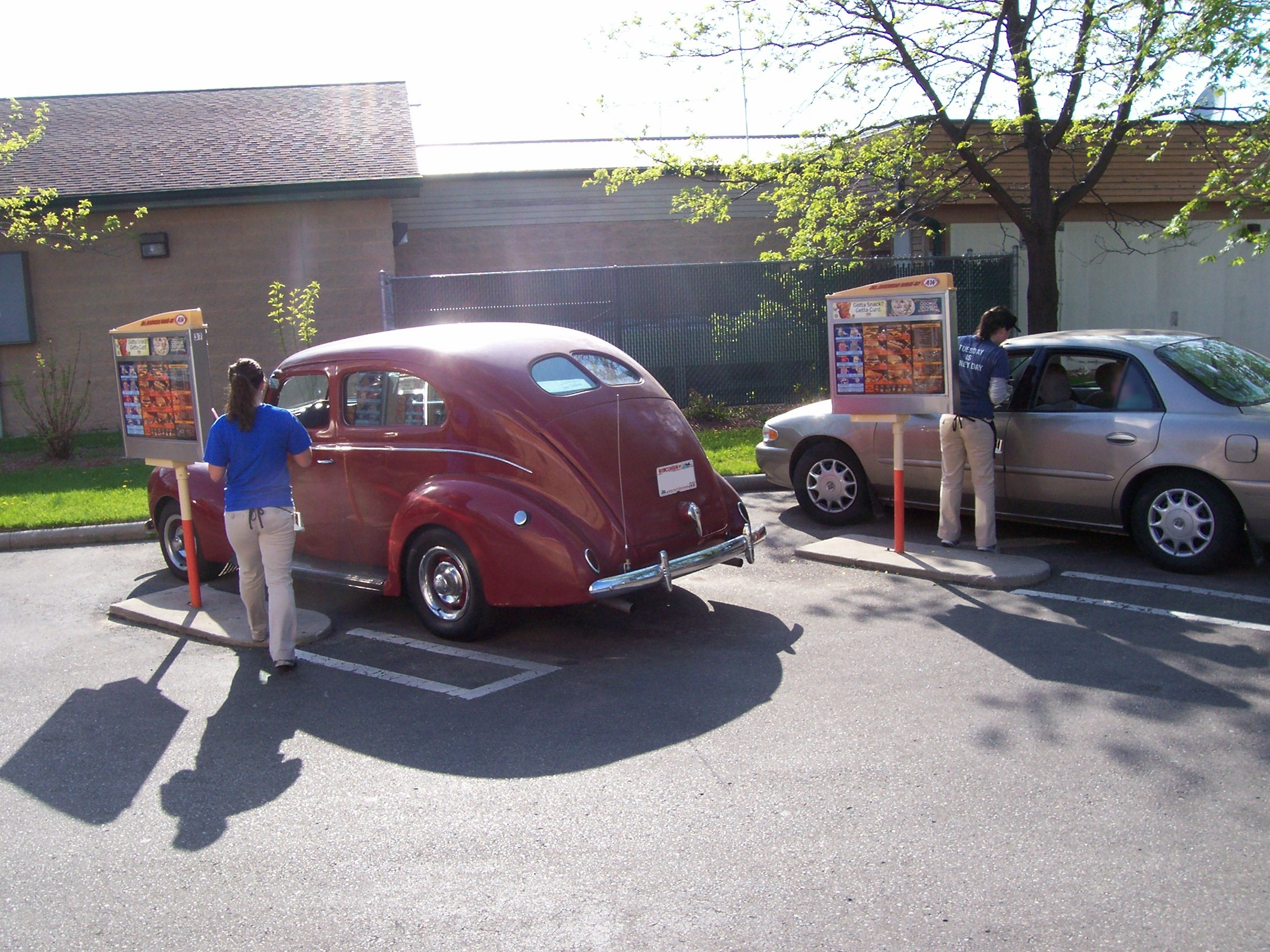
Carhops on foot

A carhop is a waiter or waitress who brings fast food to people in their cars at drive-in restaurants. Carhops usually work on foot but sometimes use roller skates, as depicted in movies such as American Graffiti (1973) and television shows such as Happy Days (1974–1984). Carhops have long been associated with hot rods and 1950s pop culture.

The first carhops appeared in 1921 when automobiles were beginning to be a common sight in Dallas, Texas. Two men, a businessman named J.G. Kirby and a physician named R.W. Jackson, decided to take advantage of the fact that many people owned cars and more were coming. They realized that many of the drivers would rather not get out of their cars to eat. They opened a restaurant called the Pig Stand, which had male carhops from its inception. The A&W Restaurants corporate website claims to have opened the first carhop restaurant in 1923, just two years after the Pig Stand initiated carhops. The term itself, a play on the word "bellhop", was not used in print until 1937.

Women soon replaced male carhops during World War II, because many American men left their jobs to join the military, and restaurant owners discovered that attractive women could increase sales revenue. Employment of women declined in the late 1940s and 1950s, when men returned to the civilian workforce. Female carhops also faced safety concerns including attracting loiterers to the restaurants.

During the mid-1960s, as newer drive-ins began offering inside seating and drive-through service, the number of carhops declined dramatically, and they are seldom seen anymore. Carhops can still be found at a few remaining original drive-in stands and nostalgic fast food establishments, mostly in smaller and rural towns with local ownership. Sonic Drive-In still employs carhops at most of their over 3,500 restaurants.

In recent years, there has been a carhop resurgence, with some franchises cashing in on the nostalgia and memories of baby boomers. The aluminum window trays used by carhops are still manufactured and sold.

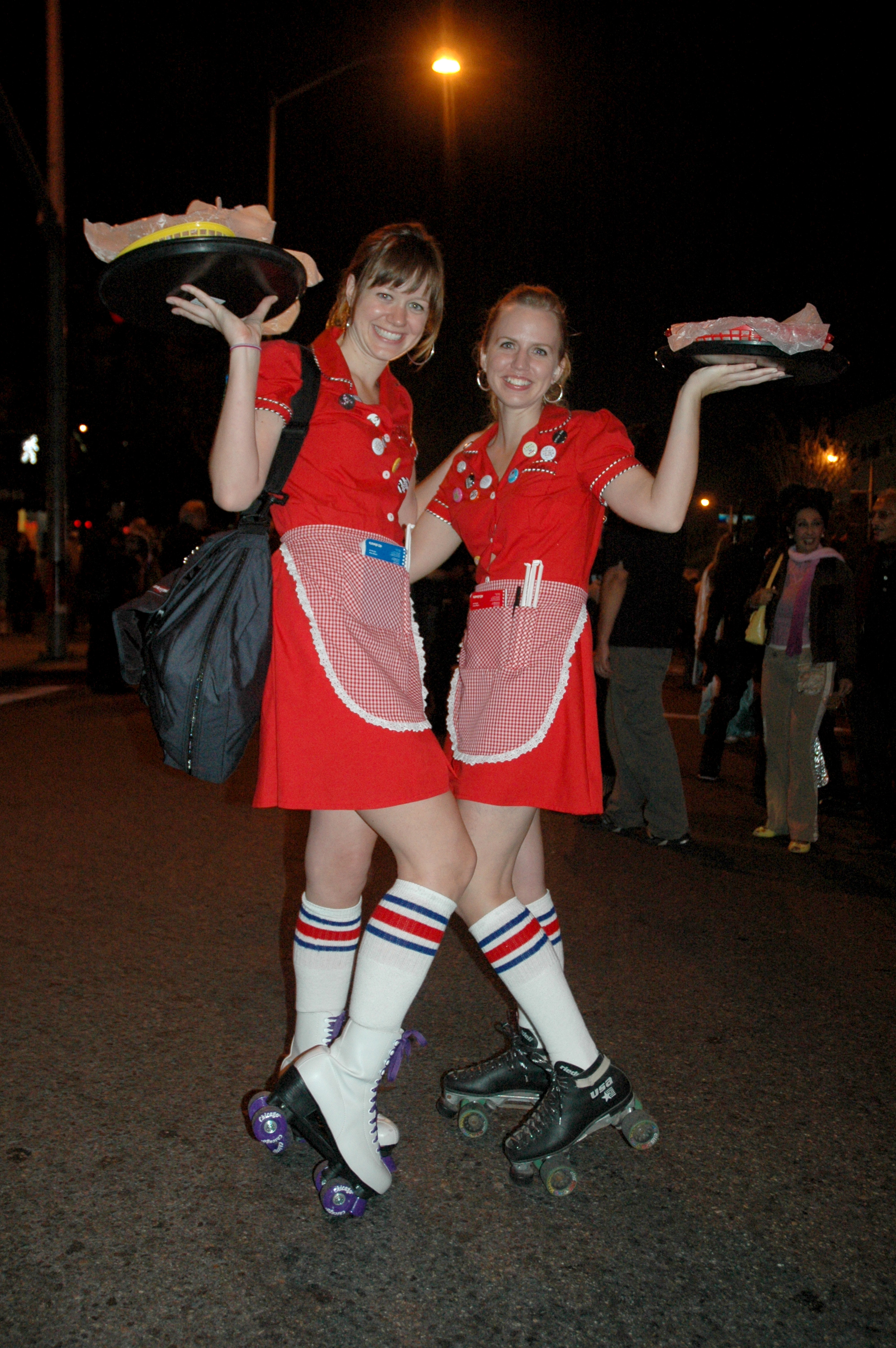
Traditional carhop costume

The uniforms of early carhops were important, as many drive-ins were competing and something eye-catching was seen as gamesmanship. There was often a military, airline, space age, or cheerleader theme, or any other concept an owner thought would bring customers in.

== In popular culture ==
A carhop was the most prominent image on the poster for the film American Graffiti. Marsha and Wendy, carhops at Arnold's Drive-in, were recurring characters during the early seasons of the TV series Happy Days. The decline of the carhop was depicted in the film The Founder, where Ray Kroc (portrayed by Michael Keaton) is complaining of a wrong order to one carhop at an unnamed drive-in, who ignores his grievance and skates off to flirt with nonpaying customers. Later in the film, when Maurice McDonald is telling of the advent of his titular restaurant, he says he and his brother laid off all their carhops due to said issues, superseding them with the Speedee System where customers were better served.

== See also ==
- A&W Restaurants
- Dog n Suds
- Stewart's Restaurants
- Swensons
- Drive-in
- Sonic Drive-In
- Superdawg
