= Kirby's Pig Stand =

First drive-in restaurant in the United States

Coordinates: 32°49′50″N 96°46′13″W

Kirby's Pig Stand was the first drive-in restaurant to open in the United States. It was opened by Jessie G. Kirby and Reuben Jackson in 1921, in Dallas, Texas. In the 1980s, it changed ownership to Jim Ingram and Monte Hough, and in 2009, its name was changed to Woodfire Kirby's.

== History ==
Kirby's Pig Stand opened in September 1921 in Dallas, Texas. It was America's first drive-in restaurant. The restaurant expanded into chains all around the United States in states such as Texas, New York, Florida, Oklahoma, Arkansas, California, and Alabama. Jessie Kirby died a few years after opening the first drive-in Pig Stand, but Kirby's family and the Jackson family kept the company up and running. The scheme of the restaurant "consisted of a red-tiled pagoda-like roof set on a rectangular building framed of wood and covered in stucco (a fine plaster used for coating wall surfaces or molding into architectural decorations)". "A 1927 newspaper advertisement claimed over 5,000 people in Dallas alone had their evening meal at the Pig Stands". It was popular for "chicken-fried steak sandwich, fried onion rings, milkshake, pig sandwich and their Texas toast". Kirby's Pig Stands were an influence on other fast food restaurants in the U.S.; today there are thousands of fast food restaurants across America such as McDonald's, Burger King, Taco Bell, Wendy's and Sonic. By the end of the 1950s, all of the Pigs Stands outside of Texas had been sold, but the stands in Texas were still run by the company president Royce Hailey. Hailey became the owner in 1975 then sold the business to his son Richard Hailey. The chain went bankrupt due to unpaid sales taxes and closed its last official restaurant in 2006.

One independent Pig Stand still existed as of 2021, located near downtown San Antonio, Texas. It had the original '40s/'50s-style sign near the street that is suggestive of the original time period of the business. In 2023, it permanently closed due to the owner retiring and the land was sold to a developer.

One of the original Pig Stand "signature" drive-in buildings with the red-tiled pagoda-like roof still exists in San Antonio at the corner of S Presa St and Pereida St. It was one of the last three in San Antonio, operating as a Pig Stand until the '90s. It has since been sold and now operates as a burger restaurant with a '50s diner-style decor, similar to the previous Pig Stand. Its drive-in awning also still exists but is now merely part of the parking lot.

== Slogans ==
The company used various slogans throughout its tenure, including: "Quick Curb Service", "Curb Service", "Eat a Pig Sandwich", "America's Motor Lunch", and "A Good Meal at Any Time".

== See also ==
- List of restaurants in Dallas
