= Drive-in =

Service that motorists can use while parked

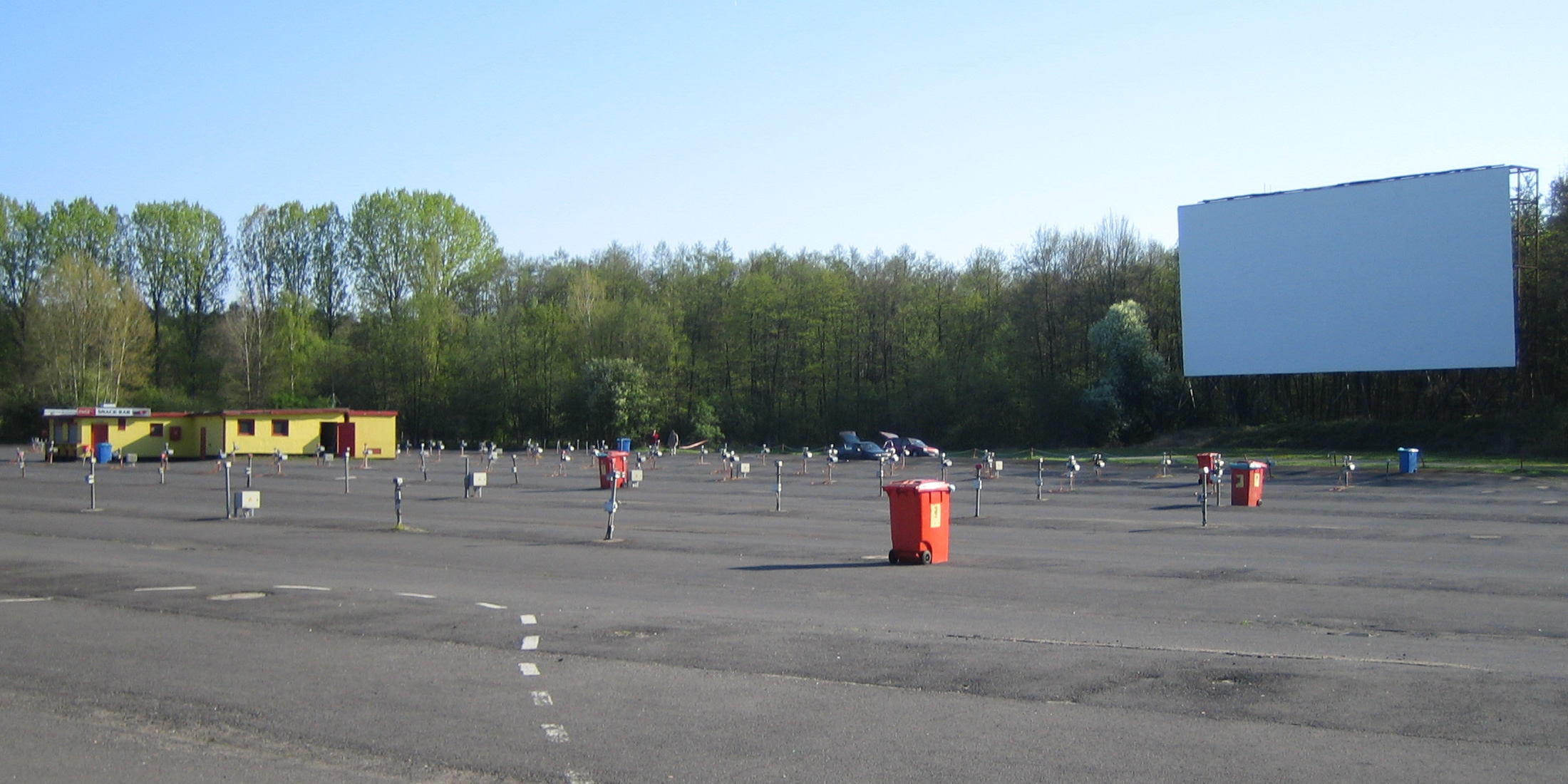
Drive-in theater in Neu-Isenburg, Germany

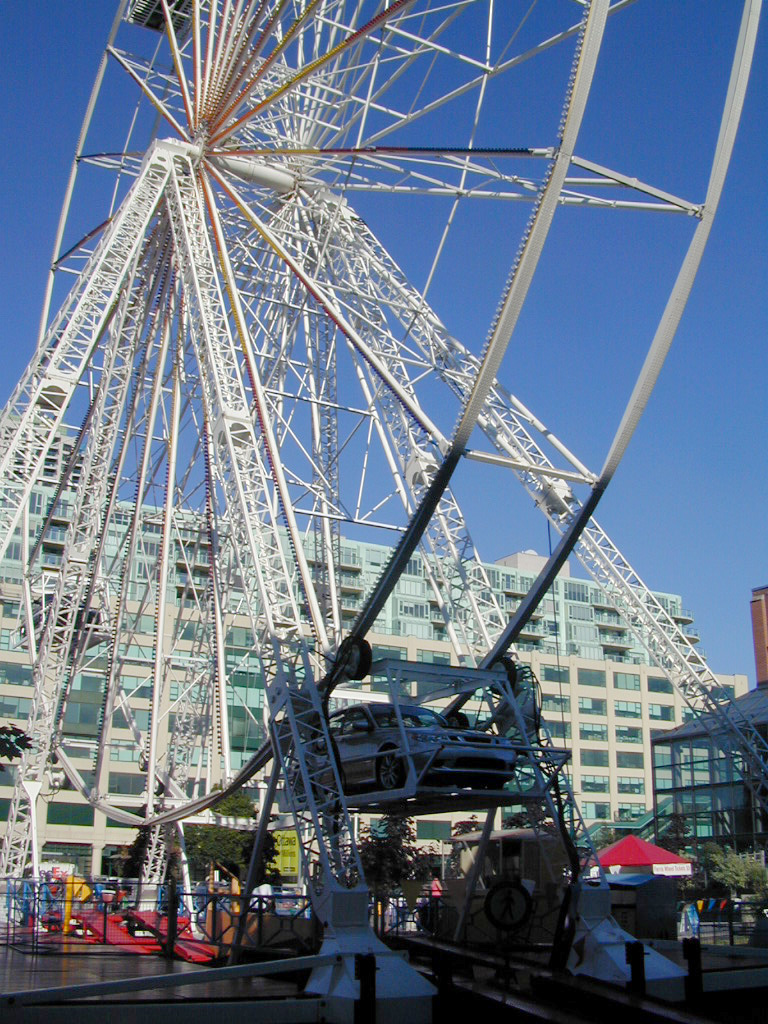
Drive-in Ferris wheel

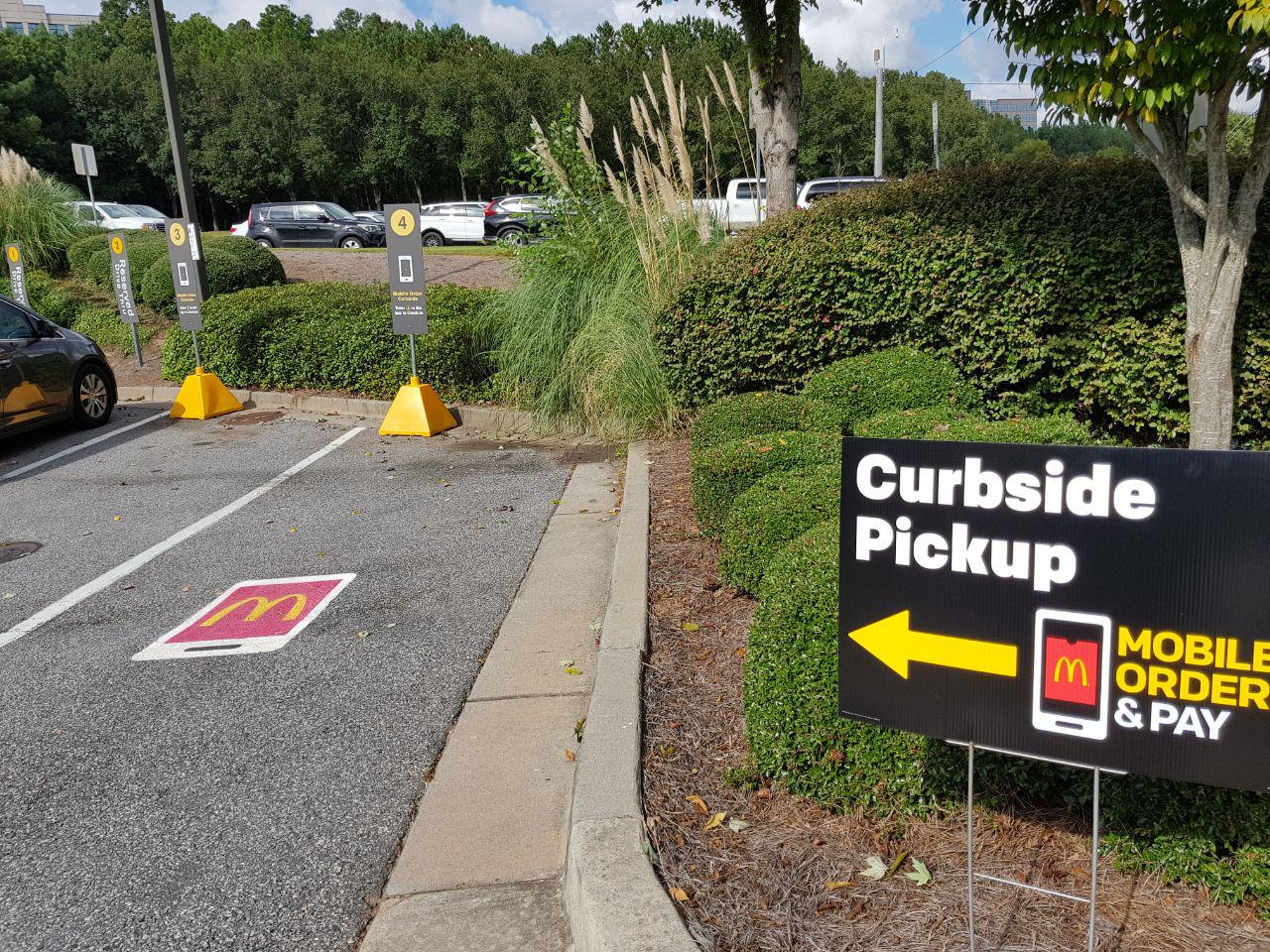
McDonald's Curbside Pickup - Mobile - order and pay

Scenes in and around a drive-in restaurant in Long Beach, California, 1952 (video)

A drive-in is a facility (such as a restaurant or movie theater) where one can drive in with an automobile for service. At a drive-in restaurant, for example, customers park their vehicles and are usually served by staff who walk or roller-skate out to take orders and return with food, encouraging diners to remain parked while they eat. Drive-in theaters have a large screen and a car parking area for film-goers.

It is usually distinguished from a drive-through, in which drivers line up to make an order at a microphone set up at window height, and then drive to a window where they pay and receive their food. The drivers then take their meals elsewhere to eat. Notably however, during peak periods, patrons may be required to park in a designated parking spot and wait for their food to be directly served to them by an attendant walking to their car, resulting in the perceived relationship between the two service-types. In the German-speaking world, the term is now often used instead of "drive-through" for that kind of service. In Japan, the term refers to a rest area. In France, this term has become popular because of American movies showing that kind of service, and more recently due to the expansion of fast-food restaurants.

The first drive-in restaurant was Kirby's Pig Stand, which opened in Dallas, Texas, in 1921. In North America, drive-in facilities of all types have become less popular since their heyday in the 1950s and 1960s, with drive-throughs rising to prominence since the 1970s and 1980s. One exception is Sonic Drive-In, a nationwide chain of drive-in restaurants with over 3,000 locations.

The largest drive-in still in operation is The Varsity of Atlanta, Georgia.

== In popular culture ==
As a symbol of the 1950s, a drive-in is featured in many films and TV series about this period. The film American Graffiti (1973) has several scenes in or around Mels Drive-In, while in Happy Days, "Arnold's Drive-In" is one of the main settings for much of the series.

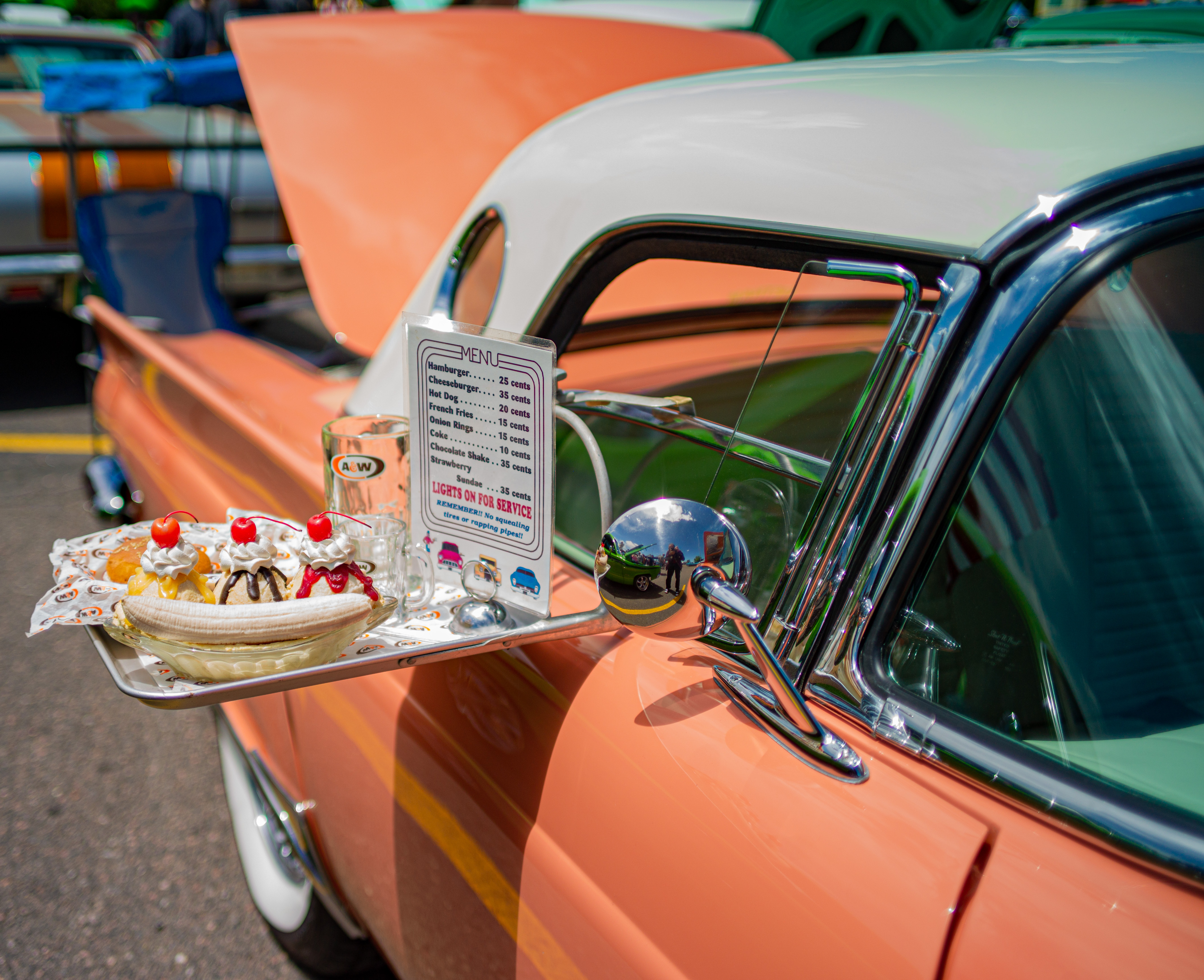
Drive-in tray on car

== See also ==
- Drive-through
- Drive-in theater
- Drive-In Classics, a Canadian TV channel
- List of drive-in restaurants
- List of drive-in theaters
- Safari park
