= List of people from Anaheim, California =

This is a list of notable past and present residents of the U.S. city of Anaheim, California, and its surrounding metropolitan area.

== Athletics ==
- Khalil Ahmad (born 1996) – basketball player in the Israeli Basketball Premier League
- Kolby Allard – pro baseball player for the Atlanta Braves, born in Anaheim
- Jerime Anderson – UCLA and pro basketball player
- Barry Asher – Hall of Fame bowler, born in Anaheim
- Lonzo Ball – UCLA and pro basketball player (last played for the New Orleans Pelicans, currently a free agent), born in Anaheim
- Keith Beebe – professional football player, born in Anaheim
- Kevin Blankenship – Major League Baseball pitcher, born in Anaheim
- Rod Carew – Major League Baseball player and Hall of Famer
- Milorad Čavić – Serbian swimmer, 2008 Olympic Games silver medalist
- Reuben Droughns – National Football League player
- Jim Fassel – college and pro football coach, former New York Giants head coach
- Jeff Feagles – National Football League player, born in Anaheim
- Daniel Fells – National Football League player
- Jorge Flores – professional soccer player
- Hal Gregg – Major League Baseball pitcher, born in Anaheim
- Lori Harrigan – Olympic softball player
- Chris Hatcher – Major League Baseball outfielder, born in Anaheim
- Joe Hawley – NFL center for the Tampa Bay Buccaneers
- D. J. Houlton – MLB player, Yomiuri Giants in Japan
- John Huarte – Notre Dame and NFL quarterback, born in Anaheim
- Mike Iupati – National Football League player
- Kevin Jepsen – Major League Baseball pitcher, born in Anaheim
- Tommy John – Major League Baseball pitcher
- Stanley Johnson – professional basketball player, born in Anaheim
- Joe Kelly – Major League Baseball pitcher, born in Anaheim
- Mark Langston – Major League Baseball pitcher
- Michael Lorenzen – Major League Baseball pitcher, born in Anaheim
- Chris Manderino – National Football League player
- Wade Meckler (born 2000) – baseball outfielder for the Los Angeles Angels
- Donnie Moore – Major League Baseball pitcher
- Bill Murphy – Major League Baseball player, born in Anaheim
- Naomi Nari Nam – figure skater
- Brian Noble – National Football League player
- Kezie Okpala – Stanford and Miami Heat basketball player
- Loy Petersen – NBA player for Chicago Bulls
- Elizabeth Ryan – tennis player, winner of 30 Grand Slam titles, member of International Tennis Hall of Fame, born in Anaheim
- Steve Scarsone – Major League Baseball player
- Dana Schoenfield – 1972 Olympic Games silver medalist in swimming
- Teemu Selänne – National Hockey League player
- Sean Strickland – mixed martial artist, former UFC Middleweight Champion
- Chris Tillman – Major League Baseball player, born in Anaheim
- Mark Trumbo – Major League Baseball player, born in Anaheim
- Josh Vitters – Major League Baseball player, born in Anaheim
- Adam Wilk – Major League Baseball pitcher, born in Anaheim
- Justin Wilson – Major League Baseball pitcher, born in Anaheim
- Tiger Woods – professional golfer, born in Cypress, attended high school in Anaheim
- Jaret Wright – Major League Baseball pitcher, born in Anaheim

== Business ==
- Leo Fender – founder of Fender Electric Instrument Manufacturing Company
- Paul Van Doren – co-founder of Vans
- Carl and Margaret Karcher – founders of the Carl's Jr. hamburger chain
- Samuel Kraemer – rancher, oilman, and businessman
- Augie Nieto – entrepreneur and founder of the amyotrophic lateral sclerosis charity Augie's Quest

== Dance ==
- Lea Ved – dancer and choreographer

== Literature ==
- Rob Liefeld – comic book writer, illustrator, and publisher
- Ren Powell (born 1966, Karen Lee Tudor in Anaheim) – American-born Norwegian poet and translator

== Movies, television, and media ==
- Angela Perez Baraquio – Miss America 2001
- Moon Bloodgood – actress
- Greg Burson – voice of Yogi Bear, Bugs Bunny, Mr. DNA in Jurassic Park, Flap and Nemo's Father in Little Nemo: Adventures in Slumberland
- Austin Butler – actor
- Rosalind Chao – actress, Star Trek: The Next Generation
- Emery Emery – film and television producer, editor of The Aristocrats
- Eden Espinosa – singer and stage actress
- Christina Haack – real estate investor and TV personality
- Stephen Hillenburg – creator of SpongeBob SquarePants
- Mitchell Hurwitz – television writer and producer, creator of Arrested Development
- Mike Lockwood – professional wrestler, best known as Crash Holly
- Alli Mauzey – actress, singer
- Connie Needham – actress
- Heather O'Rourke (1975–1988) – child actress, lived in Anaheim before her acting career
- Mike Penner – grew up in Anaheim; sportswriter for Anaheim Bulletin
- Alyson Reed – dancer and actress, A Chorus Line
- Tony Revolori – actor, The Grand Budapest Hotel, Spider-Man: Homecoming
- Milo Ventimiglia – actor, Gilmore Girls, This Is Us
- Marie Wilson – actress, My Friend Irma

== Music ==
- Atreyu – metalcore band, formed in the city, although sometimes considered from Yorba Linda, in 1998
- Larry Beckett – poet and songwriter
- Sabrina Bryan – former member of The Cheetah Girls
- Jeff Buckley – singer-songwriter and guitarist
- Tim Buckley – singer-songwriter, experimental vocalist, and musician
- Carlos Cavazo – guitarist for the heavy metal, glam metal and hard rock band Quiet Riot
- Don Davis – film score composer, conductor, and orchestrator
- Joe DeRenzo – jazz musician
- Jim Fielder – bassist for rock group Blood, Sweat & Tears
- Eric Friedman – guitarist and singer
- Bobby Hatfield – singer, one half of the musical duo the Righteous Brothers
- Crystal Lewis – singer
- Marcus Mumford – lead singer of Grammy-nominated folk band Mumford and Sons
- New Years Day – alternative metal band formed in 2005
- No Doubt – Grammy Award-winning rock group
- Phora – rapper
- J.P. Soars – blues singer, guitarist, songwriter and record producer
- Steve Soto – punk musician and bassist for Agent Orange and The Adolescents
- Stacey Q – synthpop and dance-pop singer, dancer, and actress
- Gwen Stefani – singer-songwriter, fashion designer, frontwoman of the rock band No Doubt
- Tairrie B – rapper and alternative metal frontwoman for Tura Satana and My Ruin
- Josh Todd – actor, singer-songwriter, frontman of the rock band Buckcherry
- Lisa Tucker – singer and finalist on the fifth season of American Idol
- Jennifer Warnes – Oscar-winning singer of "I Had the Time of My Life" from Dirty Dancing
- Weapons of Mass Creation – hip hop band
- Eden xo – singer-songwriter and actor
- Brett Young – singer-songwriter and guitarist
- Nicky Youre – singer-songwriter

== Politics ==
- Delmer Berg – member of the Abraham Lincoln Brigade during the Spanish Civil War; labor union activist
- Lou Correa – politician and California state legislator
- Young Kim – U.S. Congressman and former state assemblywoman
- Thomas Kuchel – United States Senator and Republican Party whip
- Curt Pringle – Mayor of Anaheim, Speaker of the California State Assembly
- Ed Royce – U.S. Congressman and former Chairman of the United States House Committee on Foreign Affairs
- Linda Sánchez – U.S. Congresswoman
- Loretta Sanchez – U.S. Congresswoman
- John F. Seymour – United States Senator and Mayor of Anaheim

== Miscellaneous ==
- Joseph M. Acaba – NASA astronaut
- Rosie Alfaro – convicted murderer who is on death row
- Rudolph Boysen – horticulturist who created the boysenberry
