= Andrew Puzder =

American attorney and author (born 1950)

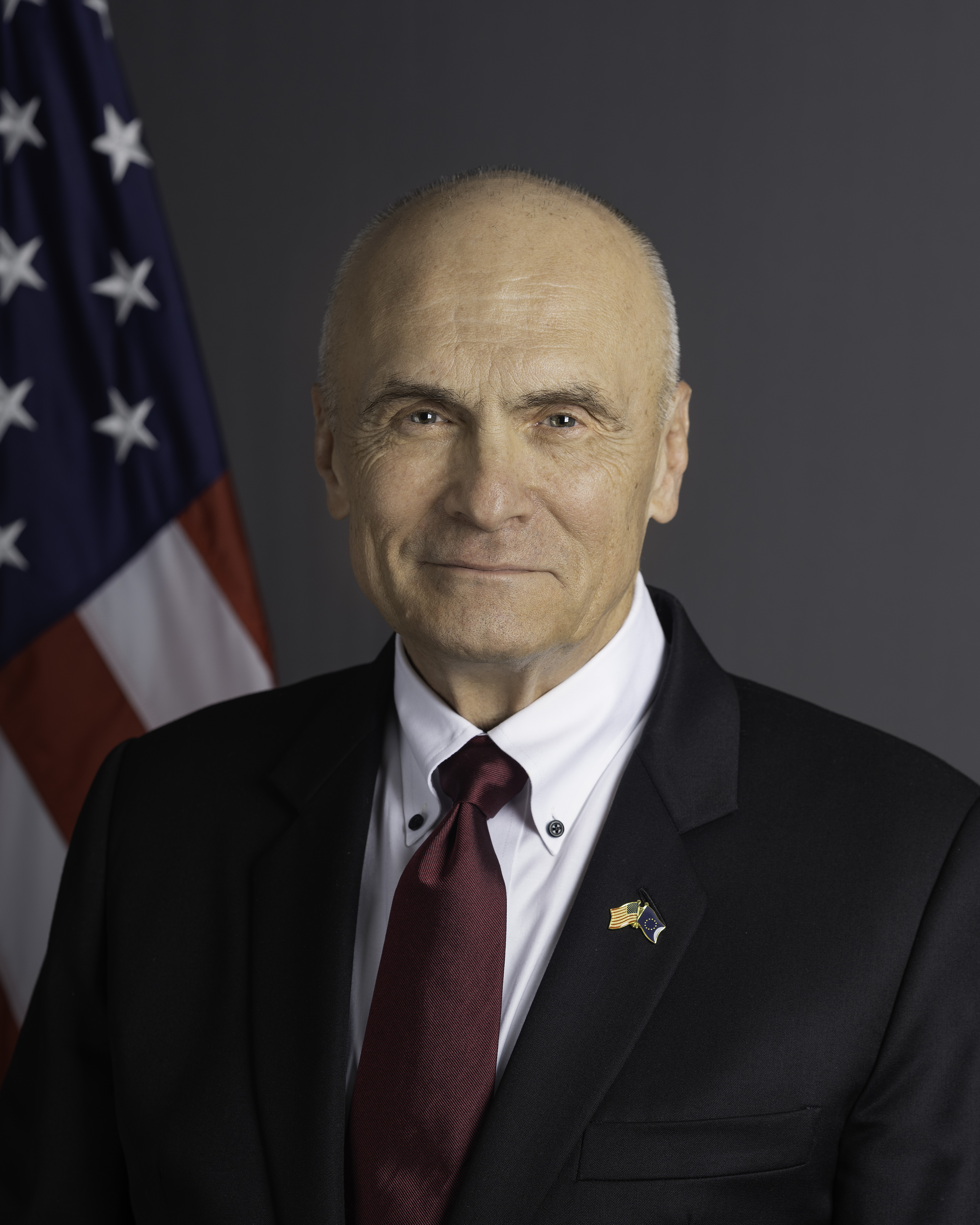
- Official Portrait, 2025

22nd United States Ambassador to the European Union
- Incumbent
- Assumed office September 11, 2025
- President: Donald Trump
- Preceded by: Mark Gitenstein

Personal details
- Born: Andrew Franklin Puzder; July 11, 1950 (age 76) Cleveland, Ohio, U.S.
- Party: Republican
- Spouses: Lisa Fierstein (m. 1973; div. 1987) Deanna Descher (m. 1987)
- Children: 6
- Education: Cleveland State University (BA); Washington University in St. Louis (JD)

Andrew Franklin Puzder (/ˈpʌzdər/; born July 11, 1950) is an American attorney, author, and businessman who has served as United States Ambassador to the European Union since 2025.

Puzder worked as a commercial trial lawyer in private practice from 1978 to 1995, handling many high-profile cases and being active in the anti-abortion movement. He was chief executive officer of CKE Restaurants, the parent company of Hardee's and Carl's Jr., from September 2000 to March 2017. While holding this position, he was nominated on December 8, 2016, by then-president-elect Donald Trump to serve as Secretary of Labor. After it came out that he had kept an illegal immigrant as his housekeeper, paying no taxes on her work, Puzder, who also faced criticism for his company’s treatment of its workers, withdrew on February 15, 2017, for want of votes needed for his confirmation.

On January 22, 2025, President Trump announced his nomination of Puzder to serve as United States Ambassador to the European Union in his second administration. He was confirmed by the United States Senate on August 2, 2025. He presented his credentials on September 11, 2025.

Puzder is a frequent commentator on economic and political issues. He co-authored a book entitled Job Creation: How It Really Works and Why Government Doesn't Understand It. After withdrawing as Secretary of Labor nominee, Puzder published his second book, The Capitalist Comeback: The Trump Boom and the Left's Plot to Stop It, in 2018.

== Early life and education ==
Puzder was born on July 11, 1950, in Cleveland, Ohio, the son of Winifred M. (Franklin) and Andrew Frank Puzder, a car salesman. He grew up in a working class community in Russell Township.

Earning his way through college and law school, while supporting his family by working construction, landscaping, and painting houses, he attended Kent State University, but later dropped out in 1970 to play guitar and perform in bands.

Puzder would later move to Cleveland Heights where he managed a guitar studio while attending Cleveland State University, receiving a BA in history in 1975. He then attended Washington University School of Law where he was the senior editor of the Washington University Law Quarterly, receiving his JD in 1978. Puzder would become the first in his family to graduate from college.

== Career ==
=== Early legal career ===
From 1978 to 1991, Puzder was a commercial trial lawyer in St. Louis at the law offices of famed attorney Morris Shenker, whom he represented in various matters from 1978 to 1984. In 1984 he moved to the Stolar Partnership where he worked with trial attorney Charles A. Seigel from 1984 to 1991. During this time he also served as a trial lawyer in St. Louis and was involved in a number of high-profile cases until 1997.

==== Anti-abortion movement ====
During the 1980s and early 1990s, Puzder was considered Missouri's leading anti-abortion lawyer and was active in the anti-abortion advocacy group Lawyers for Life. In 1984, Puzder and another lawyer wrote an article for the Stetson Law Review proposing a Missouri law that would define life as beginning at conception in the broad context of contract or property law. Working with St. Louis area Congresswoman Ann Wagner's mother-in-law, Puzder reasoned that if fetuses were recognized as having rights in other contexts, it would establish a foundation for challenging Roe v. Wade later on.

It would also influence one section of Missouri House Bill 1596, an abortion law prohibiting the use of state money for abortions and declaring that life begins at conception. Following a challenge, the Supreme Court in 1989 upheld the law in Webster v. Reproductive Health Services. The watershed decision opened the door for new state-level restrictions on abortion.

Following the Webster decision in 1990, Puzder authored a commentary article in the St. Louis Post-Dispatch that "called on his colleagues and abortion-rights supporters to work together for new laws to help pregnant women and their children." BJ Isaacson Jones, the Director of Reproductive Health Services (the abortion clinic involved in the Webster case), contacted him and they began talking about areas where they could find common ground in an effort to help women and children.[13][14] Their common ground efforts grew into a national organization known as the Common Ground Network for Life and Choice with the objective of helping "activists get beyond their differences and, together, help pregnant women." The Network had an office in Washington DC and held two national conferences. In 1995, Puzder and Isaacson-Jones co-authored a pamphlet entitled Adoption as Common Ground and Isaacson Jones opened an adoption agency in the clinic.

In July 1989, Puzder was appointed chair of the Task Force for Mothers and Unborn Children by Missouri Governor John Ashcroft. After The Riverfront Times published an article detailing allegations that he had abused his wife, he offered up his resignation to the Governor, which the Governor later rejected.

His former wife subsequently "fully" withdrew those allegations in 1990 and has been adamant that Puzder was "not abusive" and that she would "most definitely confirm to anyone who may ask that in no way was there abuse." In a letter dated Jan. 18, 2017 that she sent to Senate Health, Education, Labor and Pensions Committee Chairman Lamar Alexander, R-Tenn., and Sen. Patty Murray, she stated: "Let me be clear. Andy is not and was not abusive or violent. He is a good, loving, kind man and a deeply committed and loving father." She acknowledged that she was "misled by faulty advice of someone I trusted" and noted that "[t]he fact that my attorney used 'adult abuse' as a vehicle to gain leverage in our divorce proceedings has haunted me as well as our children to this day."

Puzder left the task force a few months later because of workload according to St. Louis Post-Dispatch.

=== CKE Restaurants ===
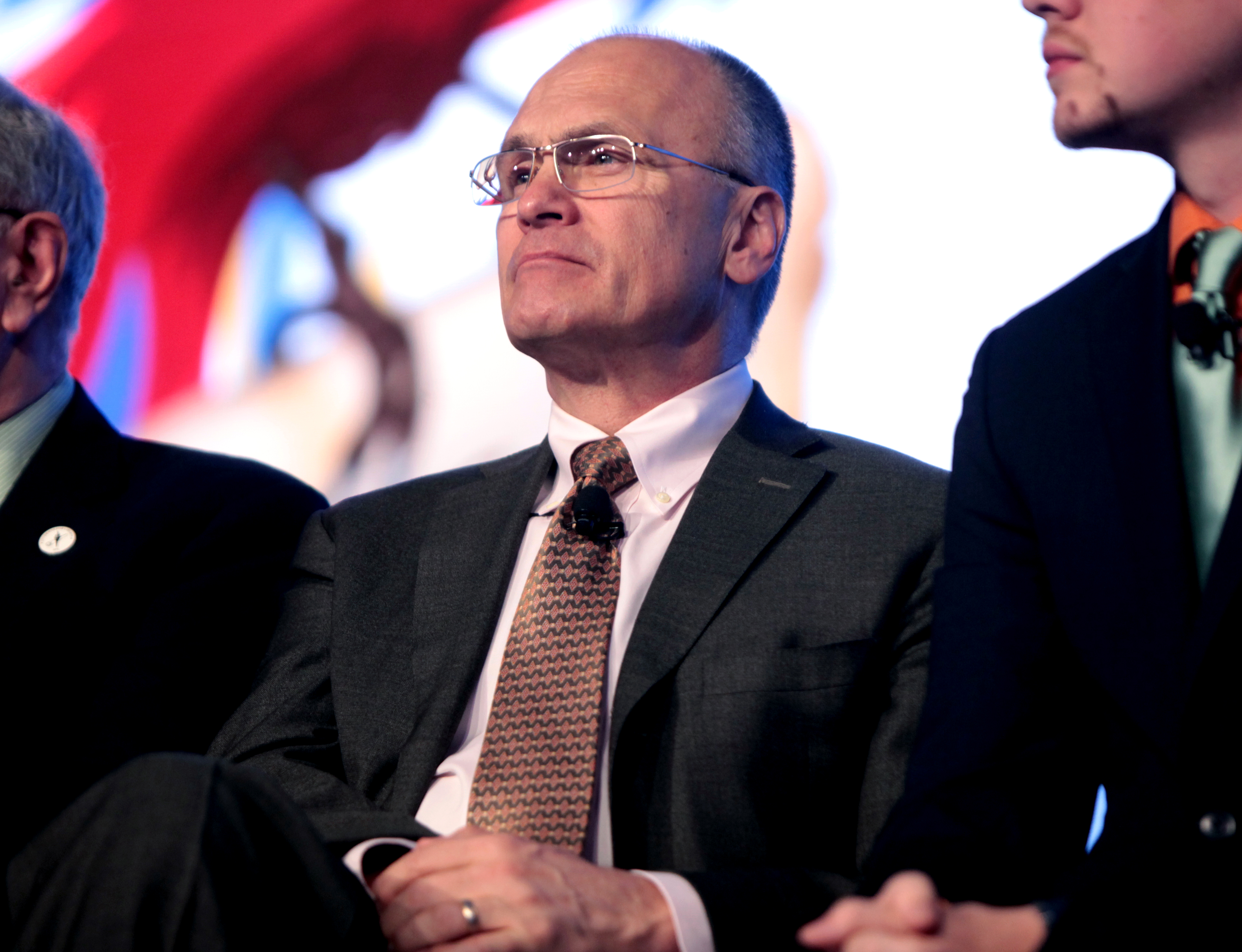
Puzder speaking on a panel at FreedomFest in Las Vegas, Nevada in July 2016.

Puzder represented Carl Karcher, the founder of the Carl's Jr. quick-service restaurant chain, while practicing law in St. Louis. Karcher was under investigation into insider trading by the Securities and Exchange Commission. The SEC filed suit saying that Karcher had told several relatives to sell their stock ahead of a poor earnings report. In July 1989, Karcher paid $664,000 to settle the case. Puzder organized a transaction in which Karcher would sell a stake in his company to William P. Foley, the chairman and CEO of Fidelity National Financial. In 1991, Karcher asked Puzder to move to Orange County, California and become his personal attorney and Puzder did so. Puzder has been credited with resolving Karcher's financial dilemma, allowing Karcher to avoid bankruptcy and retain a significant ownership interest in the company he founded, CKE Restaurants, Inc. (CKE). Puzder was a partner in the Costa Mesa-based law firm Lewis, D'Amato, Brisbois & Bisgaard from September 1991 to March 1994, and a shareholder in Stradling Yocca Carlson & Rauth from March 1994 to 1995.

In 1993, Foley became chairman and CEO of CKE Restaurants and Karcher became chairman emeritus. In January 1995, Puzder became executive vice president and general counsel for Fidelity, managing one of the largest corporate legal departments in the country until June 2000. Puzder also worked with Foley to create Santa Barbara Restaurant Group, a conglomerate of restaurant chains that was purchased by CKE in 2002. Puzder served as the company's CEO.

In 1997, Puzder was also named executive vice president and general counsel for CKE and CKE purchased the Hardee's quick-service restaurant brand. The transaction burdened CKE with $700 million in debt. The company underperformed and its market capitalization dropped to about $200 million. Faced with serious financial and operational issues, CKE's Board of Directors named Puzder as president and CEO of Hardee's Food Systems in June 2000 and named him president and CEO of CKE Restaurants, Inc. in September of that year. Puzder is credited with turning around both the Hardee's brand and CKE, allowing the company to survive, become financially secure and return to growth.

==== Sales to Apollo and Roark Capital ====
In July 2010, Apollo Global Management, a private equity firm, acquired CKE for $700 million in a transaction valued at $1 billion and took the company private. In December 2013, Roark Capital Group purchased CKE and retained CKE's management team including Puzder, who remained CEO until replaced in June 2017.

==== Awards and honors in the food service industry ====
PR News and CommCore Consulting named Puzder its 2005 Spokesperson of the Year for his work in representing the Carl's Jr. and Hardee's brands on television and radio. Puzder earned the Golden Chain Award in 2008 from Nation's Restaurant News, in honor of his accomplishments and career achievements as a multi-unit foodservice executive. In 2010, the International Foodservice Manufacturers Association awarded Puzder with the Food Service Operator of the Year Silver Plate Award in recognition of outstanding service and dedication to the foodservice industry. In 2012, Washington University School of Law named Puzder Distinguished Alumni of the Year.

==== Advertisements ====
Under Puzder, CKE launched a long-running ad campaign for Carl's Jr. and Hardee's showing thin, scantily dressed female celebrities eating large hamburgers. They began with a 2005 ad featuring Paris Hilton eating a burger while wearing a bikini and washing a car. Other notable commercials included 2009 spots featuringTop Chef's Padma Lakshmi and Kim Kardashian. A 2012 ad starred Kate Upton stripping down while eating a burger in the back of a vintage car. In 2016, Hardee's ran a suggestive ad for its "bacon three-way" burger, in which 3 women--models Genevieve Morton and Emily Sears, and Playboy Playmate Elena Belle--struck seductive poses as they fed bacon to one another. Puzder defended the CKE advertisements saying "We saved the company with those ads, we saved a lot of jobs," and "I like beautiful women eating burgers in bikinis. I think it's very American. I used to hear, brands take on the personality of the CEO. And I rarely thought that was true, but I think this one, in this case, it kind of did take on my personality." After Puzder left CKE in 2017, the corporation announced it was retiring its sexy ad campaign and replacing it with "food-centered" advertising.

== Media appearances ==
Puzder is a frequent author on economic and legal issues in periodicals such as The Wall Street Journal, Forbes, Real Clear Politics, CNBC online, National Review, The Hill, Politico, and the Orange County Register. He has been a guest on business news programs including Your World with Neil Cavuto, Varney & Co., Mornings with Maria, The O'Reilly Factor with Bill O'Reilly, Mad Money with Jim Cramer, Fast Money, Power Lunch, Lou Dobbs Tonight, and Squawk on the Street. He was the interviewee on Tucker Carlson Today's 2023 episode Burgers to Billions. He has co-hosted both Varney & Co. and Squawk on the Street. He is also a frequent speaker at colleges, universities, and other venues on economic issues and the impact of government regulations on corporations.

In 2010, Puzder and David Newton co-wrote the book Job Creation: How It Really Works and Why Government Doesn't Understand It. In the book, Puzder and Newton sharply criticize trade unions and argue in favor of deregulation, tax cuts, government spending cuts, and an increase in domestic oil production.

In 2018, Puzder wrote the book The Capitalist Comeback: The Trump Boom and the Left's Plot to Stop It. In the book, Puzder discusses how Donald Trump's presidency has impacted the U.S. economy.

== Political involvement ==
=== Presidential campaign of Mitt Romney ===
In 2011, Puzder contributed to Believe in America, Mitt Romney's Plan for Jobs and Economic Growth. He was an Economic Adviser and a spokesman for the Romney campaign for President. Puzder also served as a Delegate to the 2012 Republican National Convention and as the Chairman of the Platform Committee's Sub-Committee on the Economy, Job Creation, and the Debt.

=== Presidential campaign of Donald Trump ===
In 2016, Puzder raised money for the Trump campaign for President, and with his wife contributed $332,000 to Trump's campaign, joint fundraising committees, and the Republican National Committee, according to the Federal Election Commission. He was a Trump Presidential Trustee, Victory Finance Chair for California, spokesperson, and Senior Economic Advisor to the campaign. Puzder also served as a Delegate to the 2016 Republican National Convention and as the Chairman of the Platform Committee's "Restoring the American Dream" Sub-Committee on the economy, job creation, and the debt.

=== Secretary of Labor nomination ===
On December 8, 2016, President-elect Donald Trump nominated Puzder to be United States Secretary of Labor.

Puzder's confirmation hearing before the Senate Health, Education, Labor and Pensions Committee was delayed several times due to the Office of Government Ethics not having finalized its review specifying how Puzder would avoid ethical conflicts. A source close to Puzder, speaking on condition of anonymity, accused Democrats of stalling the process: "With regards to Andy's paperwork, the Democrats and the Committee have been moving the goal post," the source said via email. Sources close to Puzder insist that he had maintained transparency and provided an enormous amount of detail in order to streamline the confirmation process.

Puzder had "come under intense fire from Democrats and liberal groups who accused him of mistreating his workers, opposing the minimum wage and supporting automation in the workplace." Labor Department investigators had discovered that franchisees of the Hardee’s chain, whose parent company he ran, had violated federal wage-and-hour regulations in many instances of wage theft, entitling workers to thousands of dollars in back pay. Puzder was also found to have employed an undocumented immigrant as a housekeeper, paying no taxes on her services till after he was chosen by Donald Trump to lead the Labor Department.

On February 15, 2017, the eve of his scheduled confirmation hearing, Puzder withdrew his nomination, after "it became clear to Republican Senate leaders that they did not have the votes to confirm him" in the Senate confirmation.

=== Political views ===
Puzder has been critical of raising the federal minimum wage, claiming that a $15 per hour minimum wage would increase costs for consumers and increase automation, leading to fewer jobs. He also opposes raising the $2.13 per hour minimum wage for tipped workers. In an interview published by Fox Business in May 2016, Puzder said: "There are solutions to this problem, and increasing the minimum wage is not the best solution. If we are going to increase the minimum wage at all, we've got to keep a lower minimum wage for entry-level workers, or these people are just going to be shut out of the workforce….The Congressional Budget Office came out with a report last year that said you could raise the minimum wage to about $9 without much impact on jobs, and you probably could do that". He said that protesters who are demanding a $15/hour minimum wage "should really think about what they're doing".

Puzder opposed a never-enacted rule that would have required time and a half overtime pay to certain salaried managers when they worked more than 40 hours per week. In an editorial published by Forbes Magazine in 2016, Puzder wrote: "This new rule will simply add to the extensive regulatory maze the Obama Administration has imposed on employers, forcing many to offset increased labor expense by cutting costs elsewhere. In practice, this means reduced opportunities, bonuses, benefits, perks and promotions". Under his tenure, CKE paid $20 million over class-action lawsuits due to various overtime rule violations.

Puzder supports repealing the Affordable Care Act. In an opinion editorial published in The Wall Street Journal in October 2016, Puzder referred to the law as the "Non-Affordable Care Act" and said that "the burden these increased health-care costs place on working and middle-class Americans is inexcusable". He stated that rising premiums have created a "government-mandated restaurant recession" because people have less money to spend dining out.

Speaking to Business Insider in 2016, Puzder said that increased automation could be a welcome development because machines were "always polite, they always upsell, they never take a vacation, they never show up late, there's never a slip-and-fall or an age, sex, or race discrimination case." However, Puzder does not advocate completely removing humans from the "fast food equation", and has mentioned several drawbacks to increased automation, including detrimental effects on customer service and difficulty in building company culture.

He backed comprehensive immigration reform in 2013. At that time, Puzder stated "If we had immigration reform and were able to hire these people who really want to work, we'd have a more diverse, incentivized and productive workforce, you'd really reinforce this idea that the United States is the land of opportunity, the land of entrepreneurial vision — and that could use some reinforcing." In 2013, Puzder said "Immigrants appreciate what America offers. They are not taking jobs from Americans, because there are not sufficient Americans applying for jobs. Maybe they feel they have better options."

== Personal life ==
Puzder was married to Lisa Fierstein Henning from 1973 until their divorce in 1987, and they had two children together. During the divorce trial, his ex-wife alleged that Puzder had abused her. She later retracted the allegations. Puzder married Deanna L. Descher in 1987. He has six children and six grandchildren. He lives in Franklin, Tennessee with his wife. Puzder is Roman Catholic.

=== Affiliations ===
Puzder is a member of:

- The National Advisory Board of Washington University School of Law
- The American Enterprise Institute
- The Job Creators Network, a national business advocacy organization

In 2013, Puzder was elected as a director of the International Franchise Association.

== See also ==
- Unsuccessful nominations to the Cabinet of the United States

Diplomatic posts
Preceded by Mark Gitenstein	United States Ambassador to the European Union; 2025–present	Incumbent
