= JB's Restaurants =

Restaurant chain based in Tempe, Arizona

JB's Family Restaurants
- Formerly: JB's Big Boy (1961–1963); JB's Big Boy Family Restaurants (1963–1988)
- Company type: Private
- Industry: Restaurant chain
- Founded: 1961; 65 years ago in Provo, Utah as JB's Big Boy
- Founder: Jack M. Broberg
- Defunct: 2019; 7 years ago
- Fate: Bankruptcy
- Headquarters: Tempe, Arizona, U.S.
- Area served: Arizona; Utah; Idaho; Wyoming; Montana
- Website: Archived last version of official website at the Wayback Machine (archived October 21, 2018)

JB's Family Restaurants was a chain of restaurants located in Arizona, Utah, Idaho, Wyoming, and Montana. The Tempe, Arizona-based company was originally established in 1961 as a Big Boy restaurants affiliate named JB's Big Boy. The company eventually dropped its Big Boy affiliation in 1988. At its height, there were 104 JB's branded restaurants in 1995. A series of bankruptcies then forced the chain to close in 2019.

== History ==
=== Big Boy beginnings ===
JB's Family Restaurants was founded in 1961 by Jack M. Broberg as JB's Big Boy, a Big Boy restaurants affiliate, in Provo, Utah. The first JB's Big Boy opened there on November 21, 1961. Broberg chose the location because many students at Brigham Young University in Provo came from Southern California where Big Boy was popular, as well as the need for a family restaurant in the Provo area. (Note: Broberg's family moved from Salt Lake City to Southern California where he finished high school in Glendale, the hometown of Bob’s Big Boy. A Mormon, he studied engineering at the University of Southern California, but he knew many others in the local LDS community went to college at Brigham Young University in Provo.) In 1963, the holding company was renamed JB's Big Boy Family Restaurants, Inc. The company became public in July 1971 and its stock quickly sold out at its first offering.

In the 1970s, JB's expanded by acquiring neighboring Big Boy franchisees: Vip's, Leo's, Kebo's, and Bud's; and the subfranchisee: Bob's Big Boy of Arizona. In 1970 JB's became the Big Boy franchisor in New Jersey and built five restaurants in the state, but in 1975 it sold the territory and stores to the Marriott Corp. who rebranded them as Bob's Big Boys. The sale funded expansion in the western US.

By the 1980s, JB's sought additional franchise territory in the western US. After the Marriott Corp. – then owner of the Big Boy system – refused granting additional territory, in 1984, JB's sued to leave Big Boy. The parties settled, JB's paying $7 million in exchange for additional territory, including central and northern California, and Oregon, where (as in Washington, Nevada and Arizona) it operated as Bob's Big Boy; JB's also purchased 29 existing Bob's Big Boy restaurants from Marriott. Citing the sale of Big Boy to Elias Brothers, in 1988 JB's allowed its Big Boy franchise to expire, removing 110 units from the Big Boy system.

=== Diversification and later separation from Big Boy ===
In 1984, JB's purchased 16 restaurants from the Salem, Oregon-based VIP's chain. At that time, JB's Restaurants was based in Salt Lake City and had 80 restaurants, excluding the new acquisitions.

In 1988, JB's dropped Big Boy, allowing its franchise agreement to lapse after Marriott sold the Big Boy chain.

In 1995, the holding company changed its name to Summit Family Restaurants Inc. just before selling itself to CKE Restaurants for $34.5 million in cash and stock. At the time of the sale, Summit had operated or franchised 104 JB's family-style restaurants, six Galaxy Diners and 16 HomeTown Buffet restaurants.

In 1998, CKE sold JB's Family Restaurants Inc., to Santa Barbara Restaurant Group for one million shares of Santa Barbara's common stock.

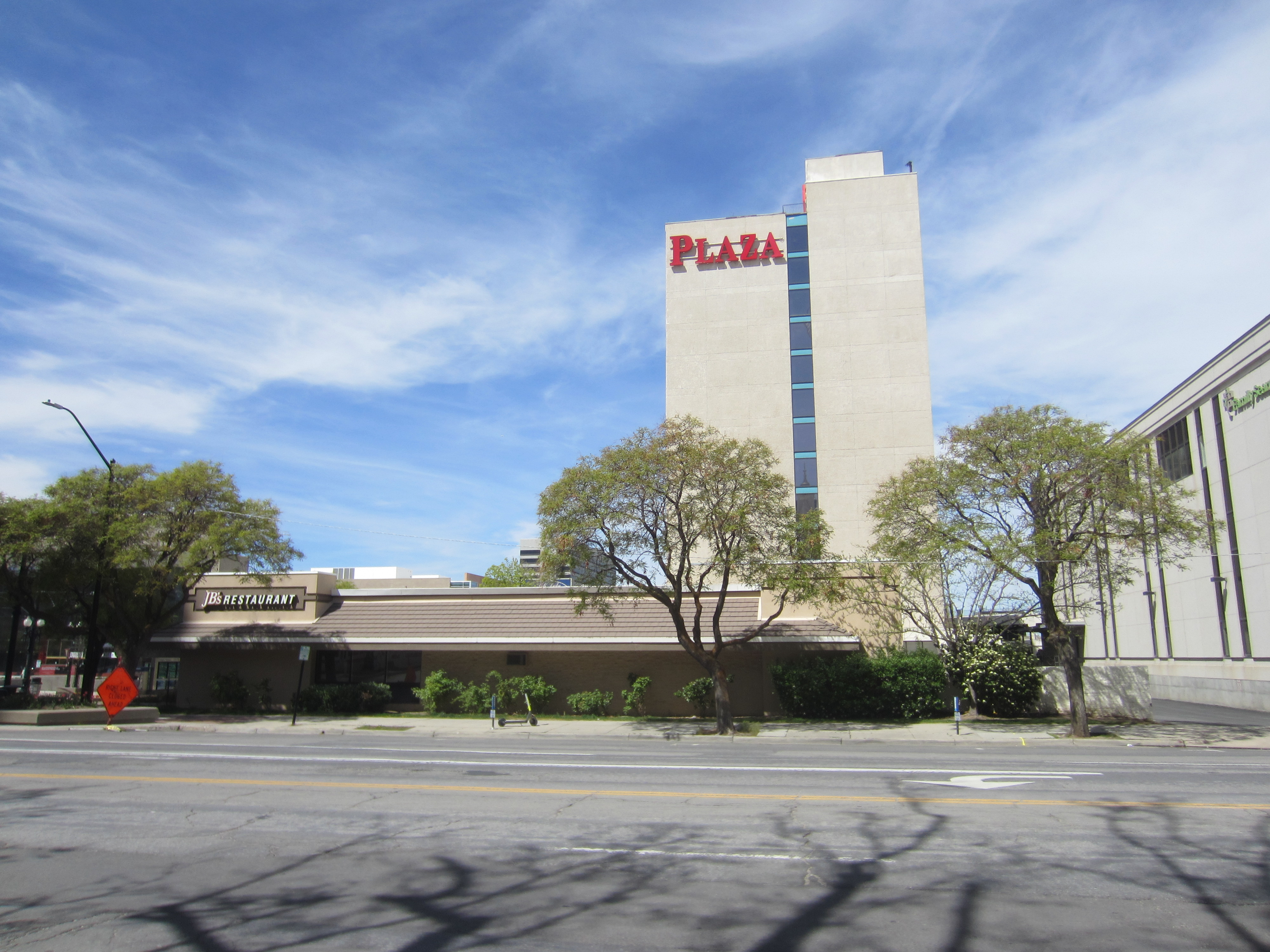
JB's Restaurant at the Salt Lake Plaza Hotel in 2021

In March 2000, Santa Barbara Restaurant Group sold JB's Family Restaurants to a group led by Lynn Whiteford, the chief operating officer for JB's. The sale includes 52 company-owned JB's as well as 29 franchised units.

=== Bankruptcy ===
On March 9, 2011, JB's Family Restaurants filed for bankruptcy. At the time of the bankruptcy filing, JB's Family Restaurants had operated seven corporate restaurants and had 15 franchised restaurants in six Western states after closing 26 other locations.

In 2019, JB's Family Restaurants again declared bankruptcy, leading to the closure of its last remaining Galaxy Diner in Flagstaff, Arizona. JB's subsequently sold Galaxy to the diner's manager, Will Pillen; the diner reopened in August 2020, no longer with any association with JB's Family Restaurants. In June 2019, JB's Family Restaurants abruptly closed the doors of all of its remaining restaurants and deactivated its website.

== See also ==
- List of defunct restaurants of the United States
