= Nicholas F. Taubman =

American businessman, politician and diplomat

Nicholas Frank Taubman
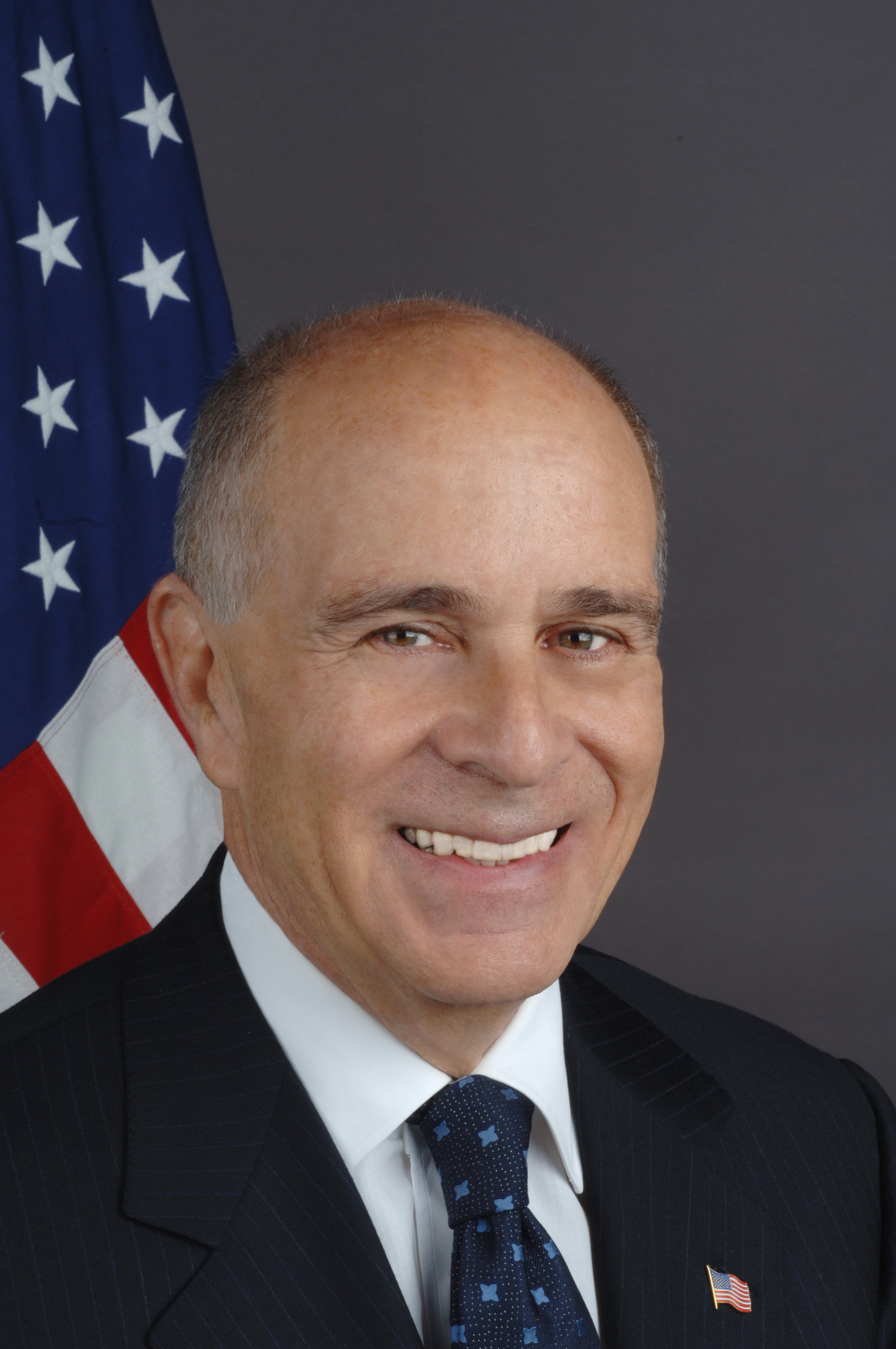

United States Ambassador to Romania
- In office December 2, 2005 – December 3, 2008
- President: George W. Bush
- Preceded by: Jack Dyer Crouch II
- Succeeded by: Mark Gitenstein

Personal details
- Born: 1935 (age 90–91) Roanoke, Virginia, US
- Party: Republican
- Education: University of Pennsylvania
- Occupation: Businessman

Nicholas Frank Taubman (born 1935) is a United States businessman, politician, and ambassador. He served as the United States Ambassador to Romania 2005–2008.

== Early life ==
Nicholas Taubman was born 1935 in Roanoke, Virginia, to parents Arthur Taubman and Grace. He graduated from Mercersburg Academy, a private college preparatory school, in 1953, then attended the Wharton School of the University of Pennsylvania, where he graduated with a Bachelor of Science degree in economics.

He served in the U.S. Army from 1957 to 1958, and from 1960 to 1961.

== Business career ==
From 1969 to 2005, Taubman served as president and CEO of Advance Auto Parts, a chain of auto parts stores founded by his father Arthur Taubman.

== Politics ==
Taubman served on the Roanoke City Council from 1976 to 1978.

Taubman was appointed U.S. Ambassador to Romania by President George W. Bush in November 2005 and served until December 2008.

== Philanthropy ==
Taubman and his wife Eugenia (Jenny) are the largest donors to the Art Museum of Western Virginia, having pledged over $15 million. In recognition, the new museum was renamed the Taubman Museum of Art. He is on the board of the Smithsonian's National Museum of American History Their gift funded the Nicholas F. and Eugenia Taubman Gallery of the museum.

== See also ==
- U.S. Department of State – Biography of Nicholas Frank Taubman

Diplomatic posts
Preceded by Jack Dyer Crouch II	United States Ambassador to Romania; 2005–2008	Succeeded by Mark Gitenstein
