= La Salsa =

Chain of American fast-casual Tex-Mex restaurants

- Trade name: La Salsa Fresh Mexican Grill
- Type: Subsidiary
- Industry: Restaurant
- Founded: 1979; 47 years ago Los Angeles, California, U.S.
- Founder: Howdy Kabrins
- Headquarters: Scottsdale, Arizona, U.S. (2016–present)
- Number of locations: 5 (August 2024); 23 (September 2016); 98 (June 1999)
- Area served: California plus Las Vegas
- Products: Mexican-style fast casual food
- Owner: Kahala Brands
- Parent: MTY Food Group
- Website: www.lasalsa.com

La Salsa is a chain of fast-casual Tex Mex restaurants founded in Los Angeles, California in 1979, headquartered in Scottsdale, Arizona and is owned by Canadian franchisor MTY Food Group. The chain emphasizes fresh ingredients, and each restaurant features a self-serve salsa bar.

La Salsa has been closely associated with its sister company Baja Fresh, which purchased the company from CKE Restaurants in 2007. Since then, the companies have shared their corporate headquarters.

In 2016, MTY acquired La Salsa with its sister company Baja Fresh and is current being managed by MTYs Kahala Brands division. At the time of the acquisition, the chain operated 23 restaurants in the United States, most of which are franchised.

Under MTY, the number of locations has since dwindled down to five locations by August 2024.

== History ==
=== Founding and 1980s ===
The La Salsa restaurant chain was founded in 1979 by Howdy Kabrins as a single location at the corner of Pico and Sepulveda boulevards in West Los Angeles. By 1986, there were six locations, all within Los Angeles County.

The first San Diego area location was opened in Horton Plaza in August 1985. The first mentioned of La Salsa being in Orange County was in an article that showed that La Salsa was at the MainPlace Mall in Santa Ana when the mall first opened in August 1986.

=== 1990s ===
After expanding the La Salsa chain throughout Southern California, Kabrins sold control of the company to a consortium that included Sienna Holding and InterWest Partners in June 1992.

La Salsa opened their first Northern California location, the 38th in the chain, in Sacramento in 1993.

In July 1999, Santa Barbara Restaurant Group acquired La Salsa via a stock swap. At the time of the acquisition, La Salsa had 98 locations throughout the United States, 48 of which were franchised.

=== 2000s ===
CKE Restaurants obtained La Salsa in March 2002 when it acquired its then parent company, Santa Barbara Restaurant Group.

In 2007, CKE Restaurants sold La Salsa to Baja Fresh for an undisclosed amount. At the time of the sale, La Salsa had over 100 locations in approximately a dozen states.

=== 2010s ===
In September 2016, it was announced that Baja Fresh's parent, BF Acquisition Holdings, was sold to MTY Food Group for $27 million. At the time of the acquisition by MTY, Baja Fresh had 162 restaurants and its sister company La Salsa had 23 restaurants; 16 of the combined 185 locations were franchised.

In June 2016, Eater reported the closure of one out of three La Salsa locations in Las Vegas to leave only two operating restaurants. La Salsa withdrew from Arizona in 2018 when a franchisee closed both of its Tucson locations. La Salsa withdrew from the San Diego metropolitan area in 2019 by closing its sole location there.

=== 2020s ===
La Salsa withdrew from Indiana in 2020 when its sole Indiana franchise that was located at the Purdue Memorial Union on the Purdue University campus was closed when the university declined to renew existing contracts after the university renovated its dining facilities.

By August 2024, La Salsa was down to five locations, three in Northern California at Mountain View, San Bruno, and San Leandro; one in Southern California at Los Angeles; and one in Nevada at Las Vegas.

== See also ==
- List of Tex-Mex restaurants
