= Mark Gitenstein =

American diplomat (born 1947)

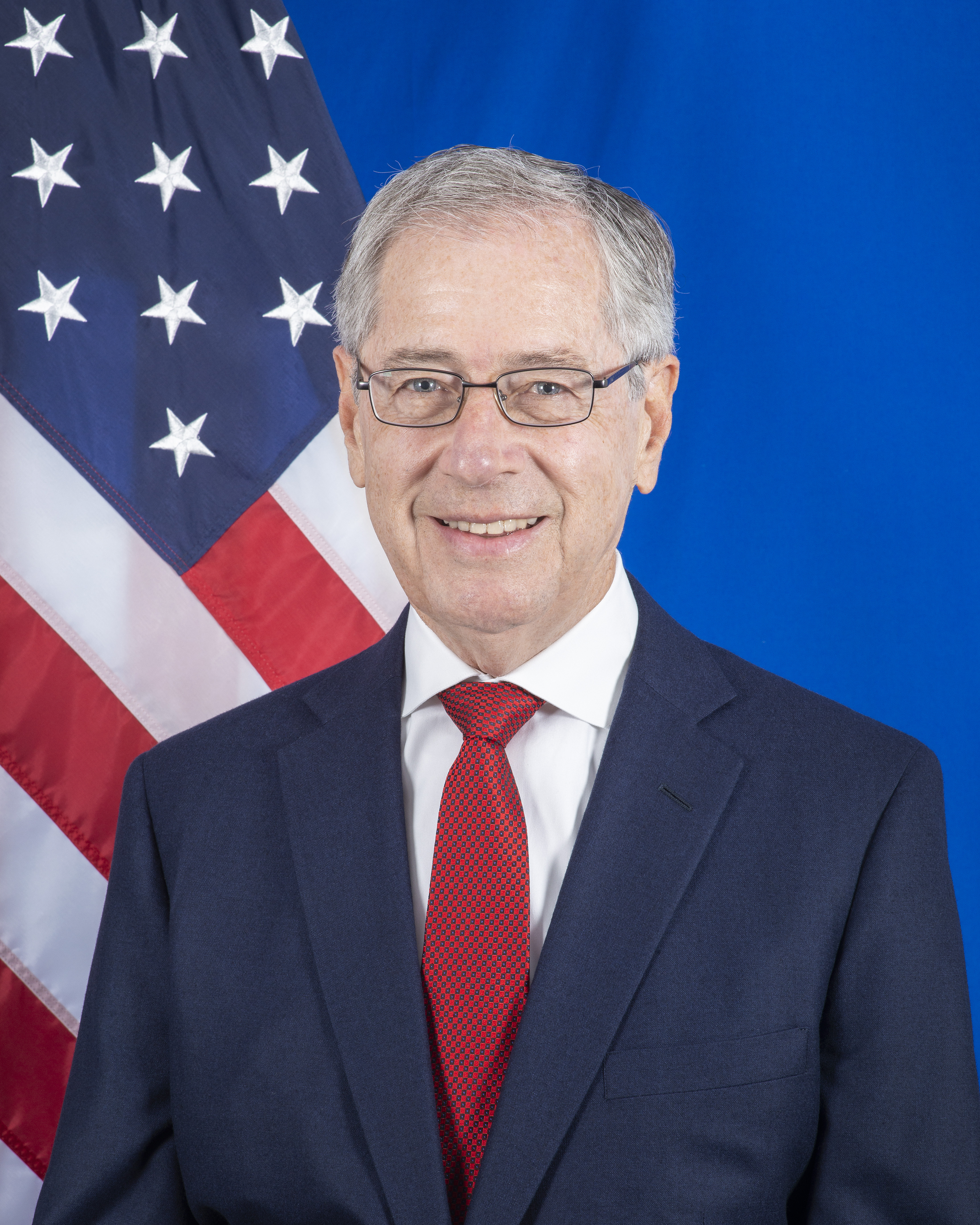

21st United States Ambassador to the European Union
- In office January 24, 2022 – January 17, 2025
- President: Joe Biden
- Preceded by: Gordon Sondland
- Succeeded by: Andrew Puzder

United States Ambassador to Romania
- In office August 28, 2009 – December 14, 2012
- President: Barack Obama
- Preceded by: Nicholas Taubman
- Succeeded by: Duane Butcher

Personal details
- Born: March 7, 1946 (age 80) Montgomery, Alabama, U.S.
- Party: Democratic
- Education: Duke University (BA); Georgetown University (JD)

Mark Henry Gitenstein (born March 7, 1947) is an American lawyer and diplomat who had served as the United States ambassador to the European Union. He was nominated by President Joe Biden on July 27, 2021, and confirmed by the United States Senate on December 18, 2021. He formerly served as the United States ambassador to Romania from 2009 to 2012; he was nominated by President Barack Obama on June 11, 2009 and confirmed by the Senate on July 8, 2009.

== Early life and education ==
Gitenstein is of Romanian Jewish heritage, as his grandparents were immigrants from Botoșani, Romania in the late-19th century. He attended the Indian Springs School, graduating in 1964. He earned a Bachelor of Arts degree from Duke University and a Juris Doctor from the Georgetown Law School.

== Career ==
Gitenstein served as chief counsel (1987–1989) and minority chief counsel (1981–1987) to the United States Senate Committee on the Judiciary, serving under then-Senator Joe Biden. Gitenstein also served as counsel to the United States Senate Select Committee on Intelligence (1975–1978).

He became a partner at Mayer Brown in 1989 and was a "nonresident senior fellow" at the Brookings Institution. He is the author of Matters of Principle, a non-fiction book about the Robert Bork Supreme Court nomination, for which he was awarded the American Bar Association's Silver Gavel award. He has been selected by his peers several times for inclusion in "Best Lawyers in America".

He was also on the advisory board for President-elect Barack Obama's presidential transition team.

=== Ambassador to Romania ===
In 2009 Gitenstein was nominated for the post of U.S. Ambassador to Romania. The Romanian English-language news daily Nine O'Clock selected Ambassador Gitenstein as "The Foreign Diplomat of the Year for 2011." Gitenstein worked to strengthen relations with Romania on a variety of issues, focusing on fighting corruption, improving transparency, and strengthening the rule of law. He actively promoted deeper development of Romania's equity markets, as well as a fair and transparent business environment for all investors. He also encouraged greater private sector involvement in state-owned enterprises (SOEs), including the introduction of a corporate governance code for SOEs. As a means of promoting social change, Gitenstein worked with TechSoup Romania to establish Restart Romania, a project designed to demonstrate the power of the internet and social media to find solutions to social justice problems, support transparency of public institutions, and promote grass roots efforts to fight corruption. The U.S.–Romanian Ballistic Missile Defense Agreement was signed and negotiated during Gitenstein's tenure in Bucharest. Gitenstein travelled to Afghanistan three times to visit U.S. and Romanian troops. He was a human rights advocate for the country's minority Roma population. He was awarded the Star of Romania, the country's highest civilian honor, in 2012.

=== Biden administration ===
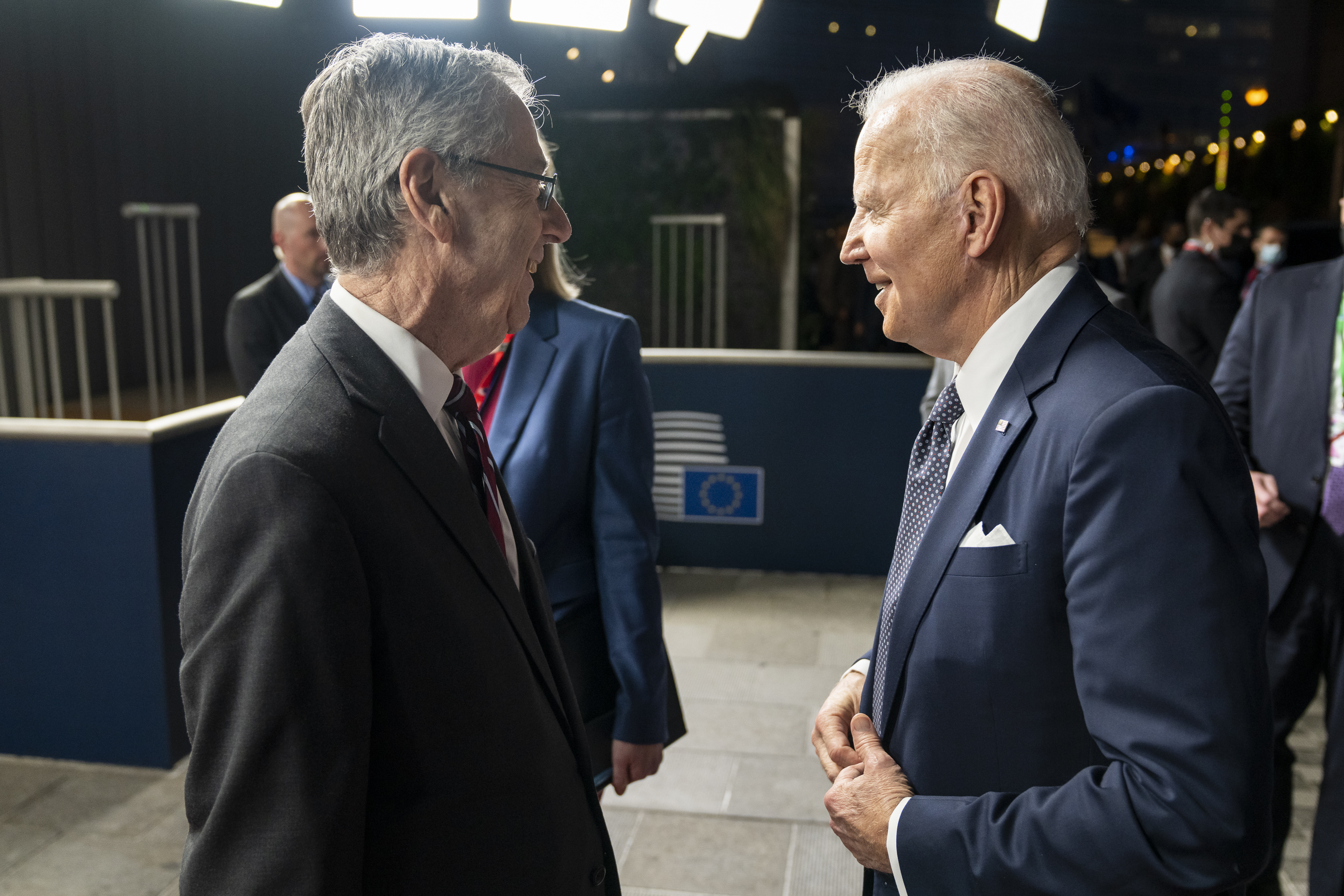
Gitenstein greets President Joe Biden at the European Council Headquarters in Brussels on March 24, 2022

On September 5, 2020, Gitenstein was announced to be a member of the advisory council of the Biden-Harris Transition Team.

==== Ambassador to the EU ====
On July 27, 2021, President Joe Biden announced the nomination of Gitenstein to be the United States ambassador to the European Union. His nomination was sent to the Senate the following day. On September 28, 2021, a hearing on his nomination was held before the Senate Foreign Relations Committee. On October 19, 2021, his nomination was reported favorably out of committee. The United States Senate confirmed him on December 18, 2021 by voice vote. Gitenstein presented his credentials to the European Commission president Ursula von der Leyen on January 24, 2022.

As Ambassador, Gitenstein has highlighted the critical role of free media as a safeguard against democratic regression, advocating for increased action and financial support in this domain. He established innovative frameworks to unite civil society leaders, financial experts, philanthropists, and successful media organizations, formulating policy recommendations for the European Commission to utilize blended-finance equity investments to strengthen independent and pluralistic media ecosystems in the region. Acknowledging that international capital and EU policy initiatives alone are insufficient to sustain pluralistic media markets in Central and Eastern Europe, Gitenstein organized media investor forums within local markets to foster domestic engagement, expand financing mechanisms, and enhance trust and accountability in local media institutions.

== Personal life ==
He is married to Elizabeth (Libby) Gitenstein and has three children and seven grandchildren.

== Honors ==
- (Romania) Romanian Royal Family: 53rd Knight of the Royal Decoration of the Cross of the Romanian Royal House

== See also ==
- Mark H. Gitenstein (March 31, 2011). "Building Equity Markets and Reforming Energy Markets in Romania". Archived from the original on February 16, 2013.
- "Ambassador's Blog".

Diplomatic posts
Preceded by Nicholas Taubman	United States Ambassador to Romania; 2009–2012	Succeeded by Duane Butcher; Acting
Preceded by Gordon Sondland	United States Ambassador to the European Union; 2022–2025	Succeeded by Andrew Puzder
