= Arthur Taubman =

American businessman

- Born: July 15, 1901; Astoria, New York, U.S.
- Died: March 15, 1994 (aged 92); Boca Raton, Florida, U.S.
- Occupation: Entrepreneur
- Known for: Founder of Advance Auto Parts

Arthur Taubman (1901 Astoria, New York - March 15, 1994, Boca Raton, Florida) was an American businessman, entrepreneur, and humanitarian.

== Early life and career ==
He was raised in Astoria, New York, on the Lower East Side. He left school at the age of 13 and worked as a department store stock boy to provide for his family of Austrian-Hungarian immigrants of Jewish ancestry. While still a teenager, Arthur Taubman enlisted in the US Navy during World War I. He worked with one of his brothers selling auto parts headquartered in Pittsburgh, Pennsylvania. The chain operated stores as far north as Boston and as far south as Washington, DC. However, the Great Depression wiped out the family's holdings. In 1932 he heard of a three store auto parts company in Roanoke, Virginia that was for sale. "In order to help him raise the down payment to buy the chain, his wife Grace offered her wedding ring, which he then pawned along with his own Masonic ring." The company, purchased in April 1932 from the Pep Boys, became Advance Auto Parts.

Although he did not have much of a formal education, he read books and applied his business sense to turn the company around and to be successful. "According to company lore he ran Advance by following a four-point philosophy: provide value to customers; earn a reputation for honesty and integrity; ensure repeat business by providing quality merchandise and good customer service; and treat employees like family."

== World War II ==
"During World War II, Mr. Taubman also helped about 500 European Jews reach the United States by filing affidavits with the immigration authorities saying the Jews were relatives. When questioned by Federal officials, he said any Jew facing death in Nazi-occupied Europe was his first cousin."

== Later years ==
The Advance Auto Parts continued to grow after World War II, and opened 54 stores. Many of the stores also operated service bays, and sold lawnmowers and seat covers in addition to the auto parts. In 1969 he retired and his son, Nicholas F. Taubman, took control.

Mr. Taubman was a civic leader, a chairman of the Roanoke Valley United Negro College Fund and a director of the Virginia Chamber of Commerce.

As a member of the Roanoke Jewish Community Council or RJCC, Arthur Taubman began collecting money to support people leaving Germany to go to Israel.

== Death and burial ==
He died at his home in Boca Raton, Florida, on March 15, 1994. "He is survived by his wife, the former Grace Ann Weber; a son, Nicholas F. Taubman, of Roanoke; a daughter, Stephanie Low of Manhattan, three grandchildren and a great-granddaughter."

== Legacy ==
The Arthur Taubman Center is named in his honor. It is in the Explore Park, just off the Blue Ridge Parkway at Milepost 115.
