= Carquest =

American automotive parts chain

Carquest Corporation
- Type: Subsidiary
- Industry: Aftermarket Auto parts wholesale/retail
- Founded: 1974; 52 years ago
- Founders: O. Temple Sloan Jr.; Dan Bock; Joe Hughes
- Headquarters: Raleigh, North Carolina, U.S.
- Area served: United States, Canada
- Key people: Chris Agostino (President); Steve Gushie (president-CA)
- Products: OE auto parts, automotive finishes, tools & equipment, professional training, business management
- Parent: Advance Auto Parts (2014–present)
- Subsidiaries: Carquest Canada
- Website: www.carquest.com United States www.carquest.ca Canada

Carquest Corporation is an American and Canadian automotive parts retailer and distribution network that is a wholly owned subsidiary of Advance Auto Parts, operating stores in Canada across New Brunswick, Nova Scotia, Ontario, and Quebec, as well as in the United States under independently owned and operated Carquest Independent locations. As of October 4, 2014 Advance operated 5,305 stores, 109 Worldpac branches. Advance Auto Parts and Carquest Auto Parts employs approximately 75,000 employees.

== Company History ==
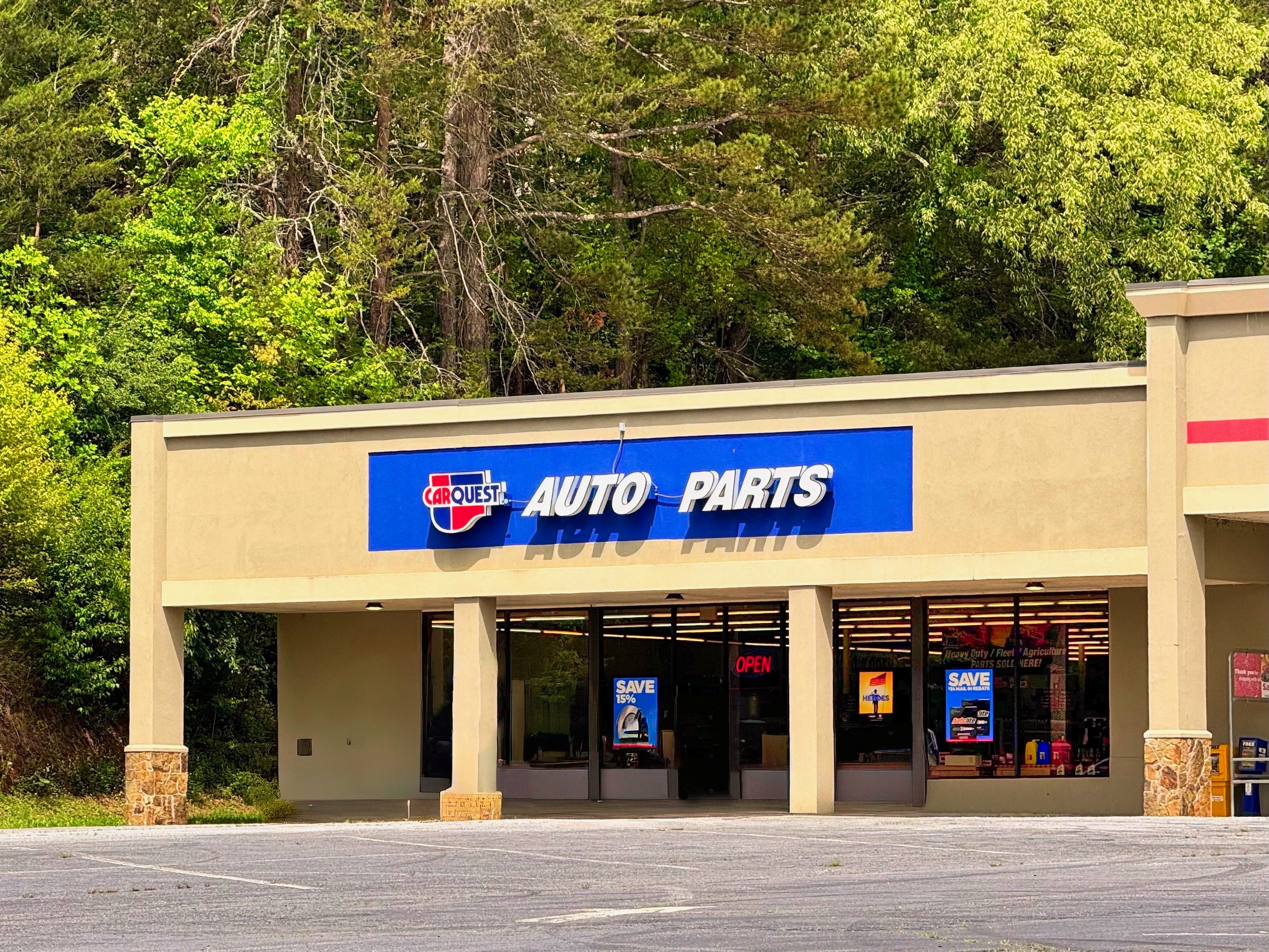
A Carquest Auto Parts store

The Carquest marketing alliance and distribution network was formed in 1974 by O. Temple Sloan of General Parts, Dan Bock of Bobro Products, and Joe Hughes of Indiana Parts Warehouse. In response to competition from high-volume retail stores, Sloan believed "that programmed distribution through a cooperative alliance would be the most effective means to remain competitive." According to a 1994 Bangor Daily News article, the company was "made up of 14 distributing companies operating 64 Carquest Auto Parts Stores throughout the United States" at that time.

General Parts was the largest member with General Parts owning 1,400 out of Carquest's 3,400 auto parts stores across North America by 2011. O. Temple Sloan Jr. started General Parts in 1961.

Founding member Bobro was later sold to White Plains Automotive in 1984 and renamed B.W.P. Distributors. BWP was later acquired by Advance Auto in 2012. Dan Bock later served as president of Carquest.

Founding member Indiana Parts Warehouse was acquired by the third founder General Parts in 1991. Indiana Parts had served 90 locations.

Carquest acquired Worldpac in 2004, but kept its operations separate.

General Parts received $258 million in 2011 for selling 33 of the company's distribution centers and office buildings in a long-term sale-leaseback deal.

In June 2012, Carquest Auto Parts relaunched its Carquest.com website, offering buy online, pick up in store commerce.

In December 2012, Advance Auto Parts acquired warehouse distributor B.W.P. Distributors, which supplied the Northeastern United States. On October 16, 2013, it was announced that Carquest would be acquired by Advance Auto Parts, Inc in an all-cash transaction estimated at $2 billion. The deal was finalized on January 3, 2014. Carquest members now include Advance Auto Parts, Automotive Warehouse of Hawaii, CAP Warehouse of Nevada, and Muffler Warehouse of Idaho.

In 2021, Advance Auto Parts announced plans to open retail stores under the Carquest name.

== WorldPac ==
WorldPac was formed in 1995 by the merger of WorldWide Trading Corp. (WWTC) and Imported Parts and Accessories (IMPAC). WORLDPAC, which specializes in providing hard to find aftermarket parts for imported vehicles, was acquired by Carquest in 2004 and by Advance Auto Parts on January 2, 2014, when General Parts International was merged into Advance.

In August 2024, Advance Auto Parts (AAP) announced a definitive agreement to sell its wholesale distribution business WORLDPAC to an affiliate of The Carlyle Group, for $1.5 billion in cash. The transaction was completed on November 1, 2024, at which point WORLDPAC became an independent company under Carlyle's ownership. According to Advance Auto Parts, net proceeds from the sale, approximately $1.2 billion after taxes and transaction costs, were to be used for general corporate purposes, including strengthening working capital, funding internal operations, and reducing debt, as part of a broader strategic plan to streamline the company's “blended-box” business. As of the sale's completion, WORLDPAC is no longer a subsidiary or affiliate of Advance Auto Parts (or Carquest), and its historical financials are now accounted for as discontinued operations for AAP.

== Sponsorships ==
Carquest was the title right sponsor of the Carquest Auto Parts National Hot Rod Association Nationals at Wild Horse Pass Motorsports Park in Maricopa County, Arizona until 2016. The event took place annually in February and aired on Fox Sports 1.

Carquest was the official auto parts supplier of Hendrick Motorsports until the end of the 2011 season. Kellogg's and Carquest announced on May 26, 2006, a unique three-year agreement with Hendrick Motorsports that made the two companies co-primary sponsors of the No. 5 Chevrolets driven by Kyle Busch in the then NASCAR Nextel Cup Series.

On September 9, 2007, the two companies announced Casey Mears would drive the No. 5 Kellogg's/Carquest Chevrolet for Hendrick Motorsports in the 2008 NASCAR Sprint Cup Series (renamed from Nextel beginning in 2008).

In 2008, Hendrick Motorsports announced that Mark Martin, a seasoned veteran would be driving the car in 2009. Carquest continued to sponsor Mark Martin in 2010 and 2011. Carquest Auto Parts has primary sponsor placement in eight points races on the No. 5 Chevrolet driven by Mark Martin during the 2011 NASCAR Sprint Cup season.

Carquest Auto Parts joined Hendrick Motorsports in 2002 as an associate sponsor of Chevrolets driven by Ricky Hendrick in the NASCAR Busch Series. The relationship carried over to the following season, resulting in a NASCAR Busch Series championship with driver Brian Vickers, and has since transitioned into the NASCAR Sprint Cup Series.

The company sponsored the Carquest Bowl from 1994 to 1997. The company sponsored three-time IHRA Drag Racing Top Fuel Champion Paul Romine from 1997 to 2004 and from 2001 to 2004 was associated with the No. 2 Team ASE NASCAR Craftsman Truck driven by Scott Riggs and Jason Leffler. It also sponsored NHRA drag races from 2003 - 2007.

Most recently the company sponsored the #92 Monster Energy NASCAR Cup Series Ford driven by David Gilliland as part of a one race deal in which Carquest adorned the hood and Black's Tire adorned the side.

In 2022, Advance Auto Parts entered an exclusive partnership with the Los Angeles Dodgers, which made Carquest an official auto parts retailer for the team.
