= Carl's Jr. =

American multinational fast food chain

Carl's Jr. Restaurants LLC
- Logo used since September 22, 2022

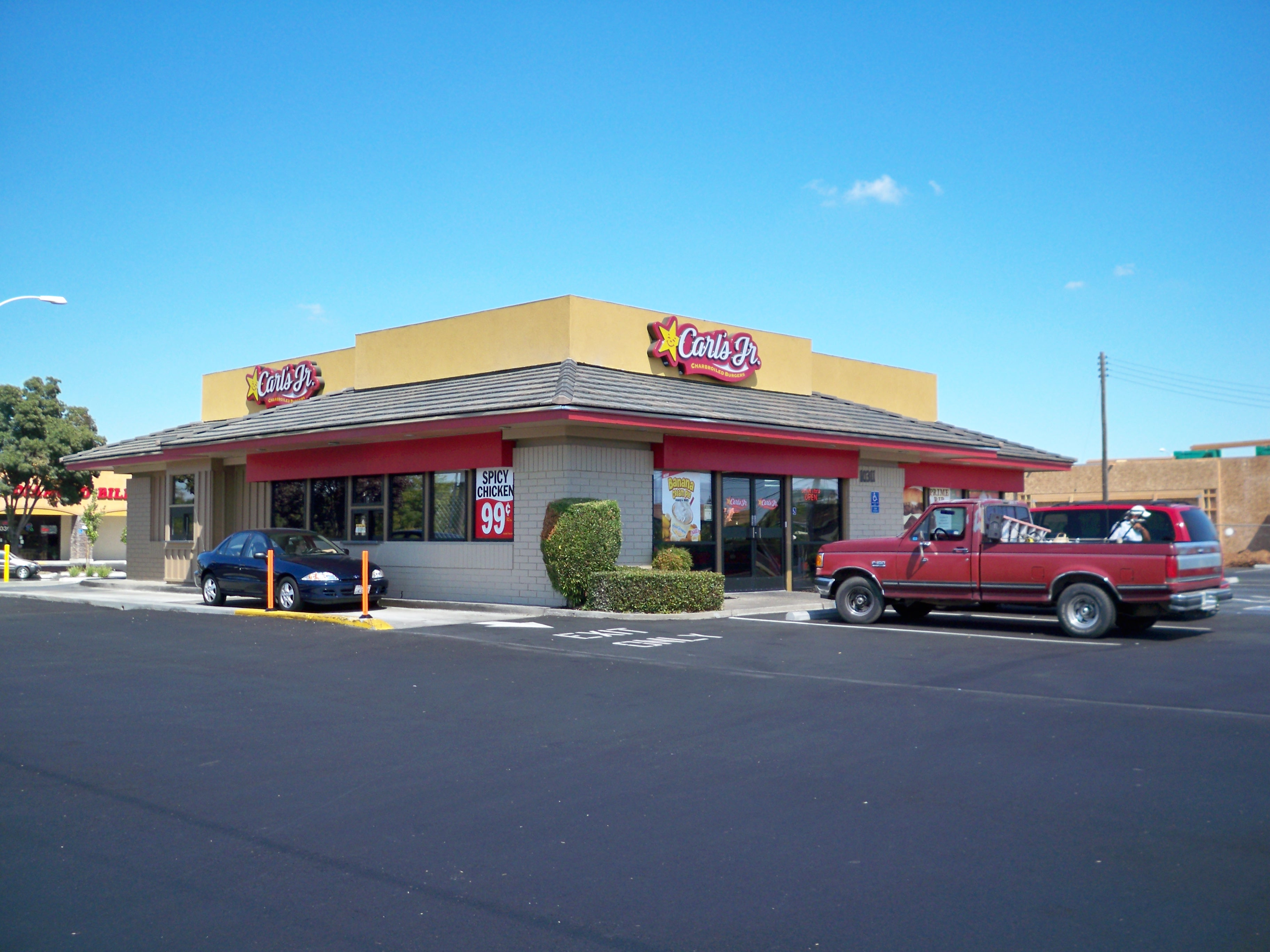
- A Carl's Jr. in Rancho Cordova, California, on September 20, 2008
- Formerly: Carl's Drive-In Barbecue (1941–1956)
- Type: Subsidiary
- Industry: Fast-food restaurants Franchising
- Founded: July 17, 1941; 85 years ago Anaheim, California, U.S.
- Founders: Carl Karcher; Margaret Karcher
- Headquarters: 6700 Tower Circle Franklin, Tennessee 37067, U.S.
- Number of locations: 1,062 (US domestic, 2021); 2,124 (global, 2021); 3,186 (Total)
- Area served: United States (incl. Puerto Rico), Canada, Australia, Cambodia, Chile, China, Denmark, Dominican Republic, Ecuador, Guatemala, India, Indonesia, Japan, Malaysia, Mexico, New Zealand, Nicaragua, Singapore, Spain, Switzerland, Turkey, United Kingdom, France
- Key people: Caleb Hubbard (president & CEO)
- Products: Hamburgers; Chicken; Sandwiches; French fries; Soft drinks; Milkshakes; Salads; Desserts; Burritos; Nachos; Coffee; Wraps
- Parent: CKE Restaurants (1966–present)
- Website: carlsjr.com

Carl's Jr. Restaurants LLC is an American fast-food restaurant chain owned by CKE Restaurant Holdings, Inc., who also owns Hardee's, with franchisees in North and South America, Asia, Oceania, Europe, and Africa.

In 2016, Entrepreneur listed Carl's Jr. as No. 54 on their Top Franchise 500 list, which ranks the overall financial strength, stability, and growth rate for the top 500 franchises in any field across the United States.

As of March 2016, CKE (the parent company of Carl's Jr. and Hardee's) had a total of 3,664 franchised or company-operated restaurants in 44 states (both chains are totally absent from New England) and 38 foreign countries and U.S. territories.

== History ==
=== Founding ===
In 1941, Carl Karcher (1917–2008), who was a truck driver, and his wife Margaret Karcher (1915–2006), borrowed $311 ($6,808 in 2025 dollars) on their Plymouth automobile and added $15 ($328 in 2025 dollars) in savings to purchase a hot dog cart on the corner of Florence and Central Avenues in Los Angeles. From their newly purchased cart, they sold hot dogs, chili dogs, and tamales for a dime ($2 in 2025 dollars), and soda for a nickel ($1 in 2025 dollars). Within a few years, Carl and Margaret owned and operated four hot dog stands in Los Angeles. In 1945, the Karchers moved the short distance to Anaheim, California, and opened their first full-service restaurant, Carl's Drive-In Barbecue at 1108 North Palm Street (now Harbor Boulevard). In 1946, hamburgers were added to the menu for the first time.

In 1956, Karcher opened the first two Carl's Jr. restaurants – so named because they were a smaller version of Carl's Drive-In Barbecue restaurant – in Anaheim and Brea. The first local Carl's Jr. was built in 1956 on the former Janss Street next to St. Boniface Catholic Church about half a block away from Anaheim High School. That Carl's Jr. became the church's Bethany Hall while another restaurant is located one block south on Harbor Boulevard. The former flagship Carl's Jr. is located at 1200 North Harbor Boulevard in Anaheim next to the old corporate office at 401 Carl Karcher Way until 2003, when the company moved its headquarters to a larger facility 500 feet north of the original location at 1325 North Anaheim Boulevard in Anaheim, then moving again in 2018 to Franklin, Tennessee.

By the end of the 1950s, there were four Carl's Jr. restaurants in Orange County, California. The restaurants also had a new supervisor, Donald F. Karcher, Carl's younger brother, who would later become the company's president.

By the 1960s, Carl was operating 24 restaurants in Southern California. The company incorporated in 1966 as Carl Karcher Enterprises, Inc., and launched a major expansion of the chain in 1968. The menus were limited for faster service, featuring charbroiled hamburgers, hot dogs, fries, and malts.

By 1975, there were more than 100 Carl's Jr. locations in Southern California, and the company expanded into the northern part of the state. Carl's Jr. celebrated its success by building its Anaheim corporate headquarters in 1976. The following year, it became the first QSR chain to offer salad bars in all 200 locations. The first out-of-state restaurant opened in Las Vegas in 1979. By the end of the decade, sales exceeded the $100 million mark. Carl's Jr. also experimented with fast-food Mexican cuisine in the 1970s and early 1980s with a spin-off called Taco de Carlos. The units all closed by the early 1980s, with Karcher later stating that this was due to the locations being too far apart from each other.

=== Franchising ===
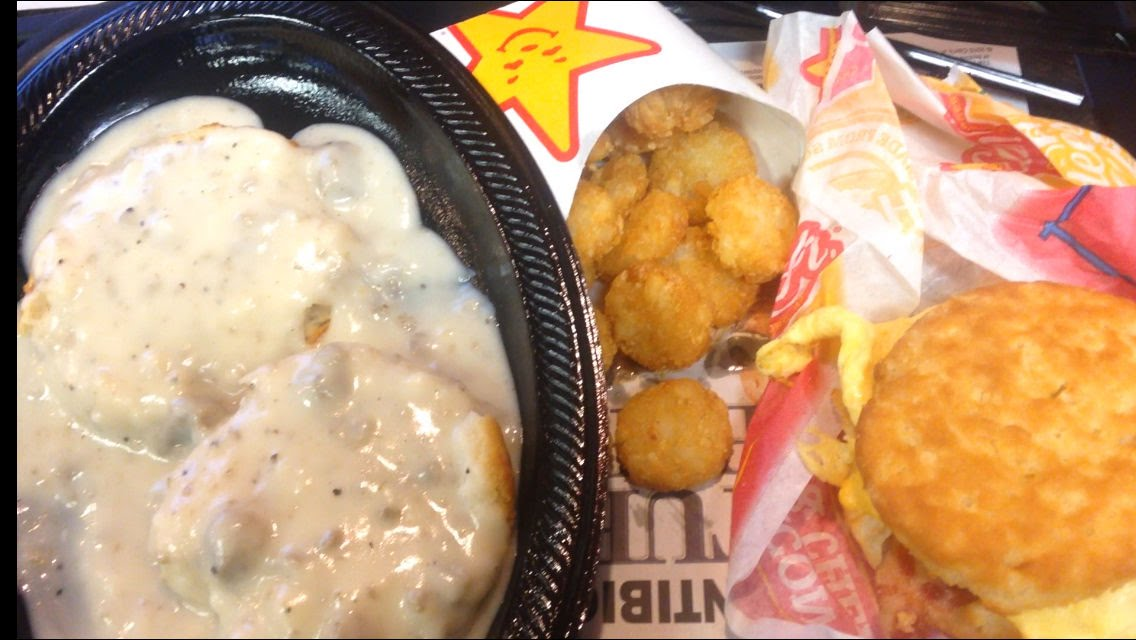
Breakfast food served at a Carl's Jr. in La Mesa, California, in 2016. Carl's Jr. first began serving breakfast in 1984.

In 1980, the company hired its 10,000th employee, doubling its employee count in just three years. In 1981, with 300 restaurants in operation, Carl Karcher Enterprises became a publicly held company. In 1984, Carl's Jr. was franchised for the first time. Carl's Jr.'s menu expanded during the decade with the addition of the Western Bacon Cheeseburger, breakfast items, a charbroiled chicken sandwich line, and self-service soda fountains. By the end of the decade, sales topped $480 million at 534 restaurants. The company also opened its first international units in the Pacific Rim. In addition, Carl's Jr. was one of the first chains to introduce a debit card payment system, inviting customers to use their ATM cards in the restaurants.

In 1988, Karcher and his family were accused of insider trading by the Securities and Exchange Commission. They had sold large quantities of stock before the price dropped. Karcher agreed to a settlement with the SEC and paid more than half a million dollars in fines.

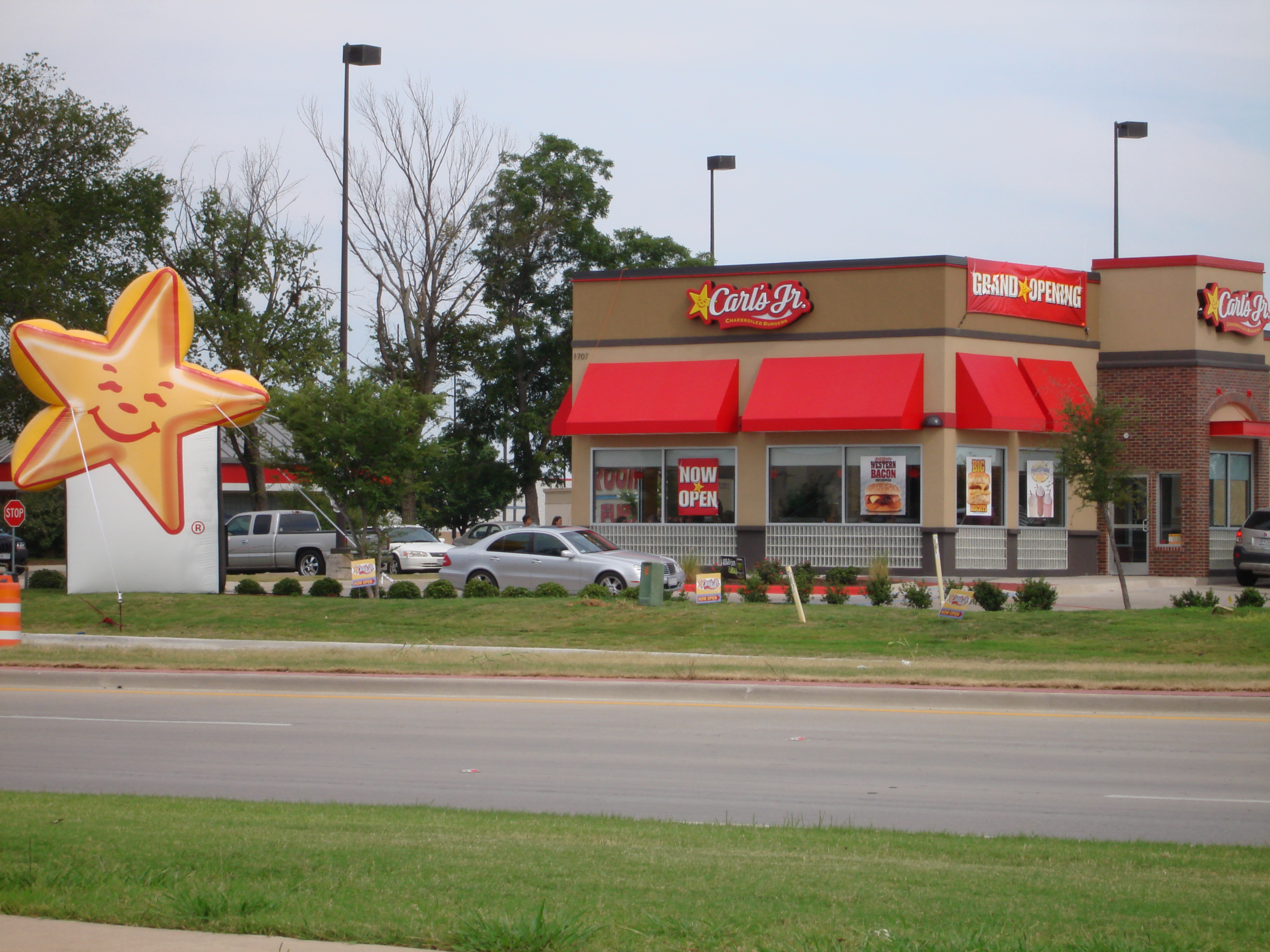
Former Carl's Jr. in Denton, Texas. This location closed in 2018.

Carl's Jr. struggled to find success in Arizona and Texas, which for a time diminished hope of expansion to other states, though later restaurants in Nevada, Oregon, and Washington proved to be successful. During the 1990s, Karcher and the board of directors began clashing, often publicly, over marketing and business practices, including the chain's attempt at dual branding with such chains as The Green Burrito and its new advertising campaigns. Karcher was removed as chairman of the company by its board of directors on October 1, 1993. Soon after, the board of directors took a new approach by cutting the menu, lowering prices, and introducing a new marketing campaign which targeted younger urban and suburban males.

Following Don Karcher's death in 1992, a new management team was installed in 1994, headed by CEO William P. Foley II and President and Chief Operating Officer Tom Thompson. Carl Karcher Enterprises became a wholly owned subsidiary of CKE Restaurants Holdings, Inc.

During the mid to late-1990s, Carl's Jr. unveiled its successful "If it doesn't get all over the place, it doesn't belong in your face" campaign, which featured younger people eating Carl's Jr.'s burgers with ketchup and juice dripping from the burger and onto clothes and other areas.

In 1997, CKE Restaurants acquired Hardee's, a restaurant chain with 2,500 locations in the Midwest, South, and East Coast regions.

In 2001, Carl's Jr. introduced the Thickburger line with the 1/2 lb. Six Dollar Burger, with sister chain Hardee's following in 2003.

In 2002, CKE Restaurants acquired Santa Barbara Restaurant Group, the parent company of the Green Burrito brand. Some Carl's Jr. stores are now co-branded with Green Burrito, as are some Hardee's stores.

In 2005, Carl's Jr. introduced hand-scooped ice cream shakes.

On January 11, 2008, Carl Karcher, the founder of hamburger chain Carl's Jr., died at the age of 90. A spokeswoman for CKE Restaurants said Karcher suffered from Parkinson's disease and was being treated for Parkinson's-related pneumonia when he died at St. Jude Medical Center in Fullerton, California. Many Carl's Jr. restaurants flew their flags at half-staff in memory of Karcher.

In the 2010s, Carl's Jr. and Hardee's rolled out Hand-Breaded Chicken Tenders. Carl's Jr. and Hardee's began offering Charbroiled Turkey Burgers in 2011, marking another industry first by becoming the first national fast food chains to offer Turkey Burgers.

In July 2010, CKE Restaurants Holdings, Inc. was acquired by Columbia Lake Acquisition Holdings, Inc., an affiliate of Apollo Management VII, L.P. allowing CKE to continue to grow and succeed as a privately held company under the ownership of Apollo.

In 2011, Carl's Jr. introduced made-from-scratch biscuits. On November 20, 2013, Roark Capital Group agreed to acquire CKE from Apollo for $1.65–$1.75 billion.

In December 2014, Carl's Jr. introduced the All-Natural Burger, featuring an all-natural, grass-fed, free-range beef patty that has no added hormones, antibiotics, or steroids – the first major fast-food chain to offer an all-natural beef patty on the menu. In December 2015, the All-Natural Turkey Burger was introduced – the fast food industry's first.

In September 2017, CKE decided to re-brand its Poughkeepsie, New York, and Middletown, New York, Hardee's locations into Carl's Jr. in order to focus on lunch and dinner options for a Northeastern United States consumer base, however both those stores have closed.

Although both Hardee's and Carl's Jr. operated essentially as one brand since 1997, CKE Restaurants announced plans to try to separate their identities in 2018. Part of the effort involved remodeling several Hardee's restaurants as well as giving both brands distinct ad campaigns. Although both chains had the same menu at the time of the split, CKE noted that they would slowly change over time although with "some overlap"

In January 2019, Carl's Jr. introduced a Beyond Meat patty as an addition to their menu. They were one of the first large chain restaurants to introduce a vegan-friendly patty to their menu and roll it out to all of their locations. Soon after Burger King and many others followed by adding plant-based burgers to their menus. In February 2024, all Carl's Jr. locations in the Bakersfield, California area permanently removed the Beyond Burger from its menu. As of April 2024, Carl's Jr. has not issued a press release indicating why this decision was made.

In mid-March 2020, all restaurants temporarily abandoned indoor dining to combat the COVID-19 pandemic. Customers could still make their orders via drive thru, pick-up or take-away service.

In 2024, Carl's Jr. announced that it sources 100% cage-free eggs for its U.S. locations, following advocacy from animal welfare organizations.

In April 2026, Friendly Franchisees Corp., a 65-unit Carl's Jr. operator, filed for Chapter 7 bankruptcy.

=== International ===
Distribution of Carl's Jr. and Hardee's restaurants around the world US with both the Carl's Jr. and Hardee's locations Countries with Carl's Jr. locations Countries with Hardee's locations

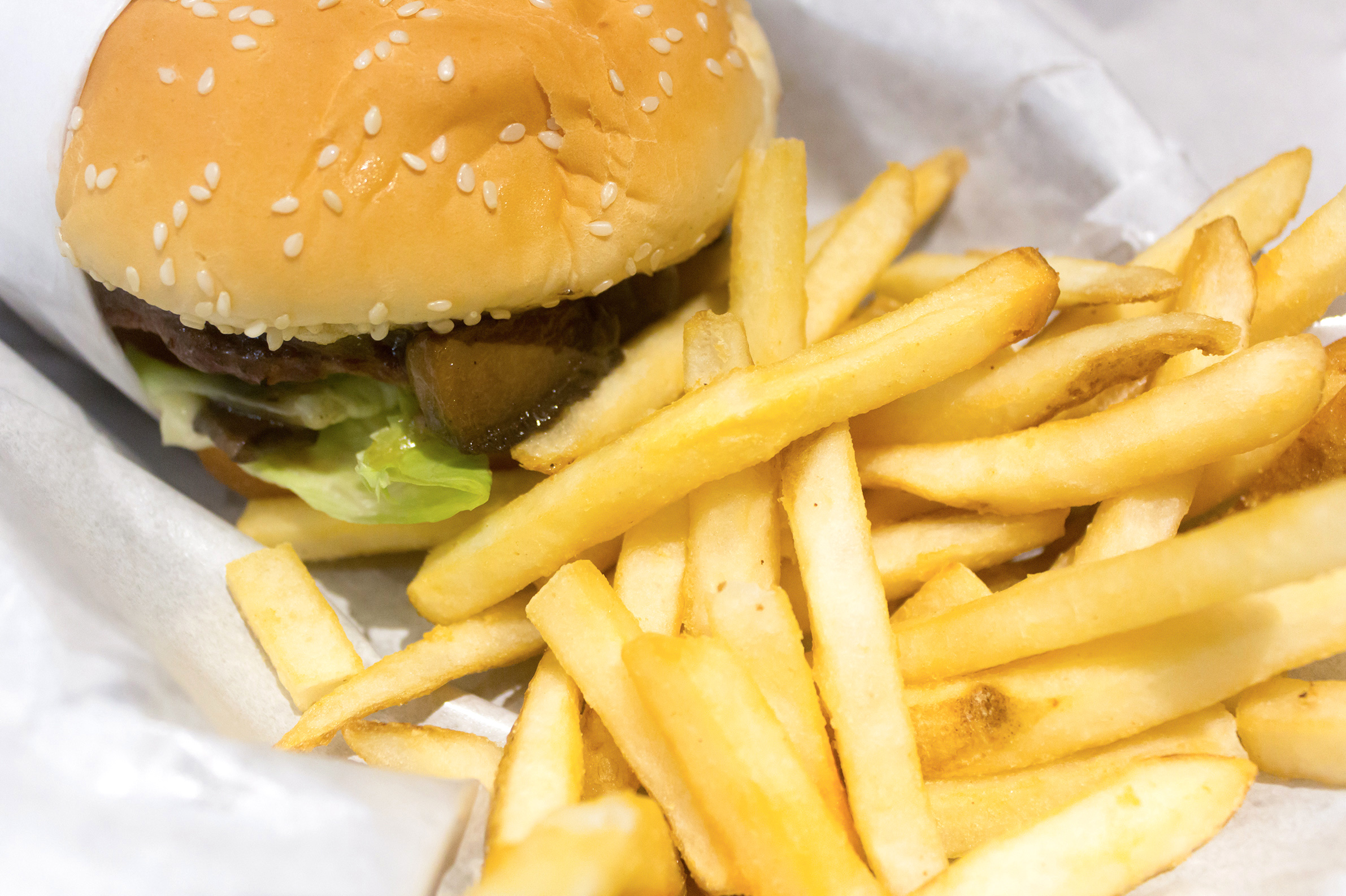
A portobello mushroom burger and fries from the Carl's Jr. in Plaza Semanggi, Jakarta, Indonesia

In 2011, Carl's Jr. first ventured the Canadian market with the opening of an outlet in Kelowna, British Columbia, followed by all British Columbia outlet openings in Kamloops, Vernon and Penticton. A Chilliwack outlet opened in September 2012, then in Vancouver in 2013 (now closed in 2024). An Abbotsford outlet opened in January 2014 then in September 2014, two Ontario outlets opened in Waterloo and Guelph, followed by two more outlets opened in Toronto in March/April 2015 and a location at Vancouver International Airport in January 2015. By January 2016, all Ontario locations were shut down, although operations continue in Western Canada.

In November 2015, Carl's Jr. opened its 200th restaurant in Mexico. The brand first entered the market in 1991.

In August 2016, Carl's Jr. opened its first location in India at Saket's Select Citywalk Mall in New Delhi.

As of 2017, CKE (the parent company of Carl's Jr. and Hardee's) has a total of 3665 franchised or company-operated restaurants in 44 states and 39 foreign countries and U.S. territories. Outside of the U.S., Carl's Jr. is present in Australia, Belarus, Bolivia, Brazil, Cambodia, Canada (western provinces), Chile, China, Colombia, Costa Rica, Denmark, Dominican Republic, Ecuador, France, Guatemala, Honduras, India, Indonesia (Closed in December 2023, reopened in July 2024 under new management), Japan, Malaysia, Mexico, New Zealand, Nicaragua, Panama, Russia, Spain, Turkey, and Vietnam.

Despite the 2022 Russian invasion of Ukraine, Carl's Jr. continued its operations in Russia. The company has a longstanding presence in the country, having announced a master franchise agreement with Nevada Russia Franchising Company LLC in August 2021 to expand its footprint by developing over 300 additional restaurants.

In August 2022, Carl's Jr. arrived in Argentina with plans to open seven locations and target the "gourmet" burger market. The American burger chain had already been analyzing the local market since June 2022.

A Carl's Jr. restaurant at Shanghai Pudong International Airport

In November 2022, Carl's Jr. closed nearly all of its restaurants in China. Only three franchise stores remain in the country: two in Shanghai (Hongqiao International Airport and Pudong International Airport) and one at Qingdao Jiaodong International Airport.

In May 2024, the Boparan Restaurant Group announced it would begin a master license agreement with Carl's Jr., bringing the chain to the United Kingdom. The first British Carl's Jr. opened in April 2025, in St David's shopping centre, Cardiff.

In July 2024, the Carl's Jr. Australia master franchisee went into voluntary administration with 20 company owned restaurants immediately closed meantime, but four company and 25 independent stores operate. KPMG has been appointed administrators of CJ’s QSR Group Pty Ltd, and the CJ’s Group. The 25 unaffected stores were quietly transferred to direct supervision by CKE Restaurants. Suspected factors of the collapse include reduced discretional spending, increased costs, and overly optimistic expansion to places 'in the middle of nowhere' amid fierce market saturation. CKE still stands committed to expanding to Australia, despite the collapse. In November 2024, creditors elected to liquidate the operator. While some stores were successfully sold to franchisees, most of the directly franchised stores reportedly survived, and there are plans for further expansion in Australia but without another operator, a vast number stores made of predominantly most of the branch-owned stores seem to have closed permanently and/or become or leased to other operators.

==== Former ====
Carl's Jr. formerly had a presence in the Philippines and Thailand.

== Philanthropy ==
CKE conducts an annual Stars for Heroes in-store fundraising campaign at both Carl's Jr. and Hardee's to benefit U.S. military veterans and their families.

== Co-branding ==
In several Western U.S. locations, Carl's Jr. parent CKE has begun operating co-branded restaurants with its Green Burrito group. This same strategy has also been used by Yum! Brands with its KFC, Pizza Hut, Taco Bell, A&W Restaurants, and Long John Silver's concepts to expand brands without the additional expense of new buildings and land.

== Advertising ==
Carl's Jr. logo from June 12, 2006, to March 28, 2017. Still used at most locations.

Carl's Jr. logo from November 5, 2018, to September 21, 2022 (it was still used on its website until early December). Still used on some newly remodeled locations.

When Carl's Jr. first started rebranding Hardee's locations into the Carl's Jr. name, both chains mostly kept separate ads. This changed with the now-infamous Paris Hilton ad (see below) and the "Without us, some guys would starve." Campaign, which aired as either for Carl's Jr. or Hardee's, depending on where the ads aired. This would continue with other ads for the next several years, including ads by Kate Upton, Kim Kardashian, Emily Ratajkowski, Sara Jean Underwood, Hannah Ferguson, Heidi Klum, Charlotte McKinney, Ronda Rousey, Padma Lakshmi, and Hayden Panettiere.

In January 1997, commercials featuring NBA player Dennis Rodman were pulled after he was fined a then-record $25,000 and suspended for 11 games for kicking a cameraman in the groin during a game in Minneapolis, Minnesota. His commercials resumed airing after his suspension was lifted. However, in June of that same year, Carl's Jr. pulled his commercials for good after he was fined a then-record $50,000 for using profanity against Mormons during a game in Salt Lake City, Utah.

In 2005, Carl's Jr. launched a marketing campaign featuring bikini-clad models posing suggestively to capture the "hungry, young guy" demographic. The advertisements were criticized for objectifying women and prompted calls to boycott Carl's Jr. Company CEO Andrew Puzder defended the campaign in Entrepreneur magazine, saying, "I like our ads. I like beautiful women eating burgers in bikinis. I think it's very American."

In the years before his death in 2008, Karcher objected to the sexualized nature of the company's advertising, and was reported "just heartbroken" that a company he founded on Christian principles has taken such "an amoral act." Karcher had previously criticized CKE's previous campaigns during the 1990s.

=== Paris Hilton campaign ===
In May 2005, Carl's Jr. introduced its "Spicy BBQ Six Dollar Burger" in a television advertisement created by Mendelsohn Zien Advertising. The ad features Paris Hilton in a provocative swimsuit soaping up a Bentley automobile and crawling all over it before taking a big bite out of her burger and giving her signature phrase, "That's hot." The commercial was directed by Chris Applebaum.

With the two chains selling many common menu items by 2013, Carl's Jr. began to advertise nationally in conjunction with Hardee's for products sold by both brands.

=== All Natural campaign ===
In January 2015, Carl's Jr. released a commercial online featuring model Charlotte McKinney advertising its new All Natural Burger to air regionally during Super Bowl XLIX. The ad features McKinney walking around a farmers' market, implying that she is "all natural", and uses double entendres to suggest that she is naked with strategically placed items in the market until it reveals McKinney in a bikini eating the All Natural Burger. Critics suggest that the ad "sets feminism back four decades," while others, including McKinney's elderly grandfather, enjoyed the ad. The ad now features Hardee's co-branding as the All Natural Burger is now offered by Hardee's. As of June 2016, Charlotte McKinney's "Au Natural" ad debut has garnered over 4.5 billion media impressions worldwide and more than 13 million views on the chains' YouTube channel.

=== Carl Hardee Sr. campaign ===
In March 2017, Carl's Jr. released a commercial featuring a white-bearded character named Carl Hardee Sr. (played by Charles Esten) who had come back into the office (much to the delight of the employees) to find his son Carl Jr. (Drew Tarver) who was focusing on sex appeal over its food. The commercial marked a turning point in CKE's advertising, claiming it wanted to move away from its provocative ads and focus more on food and as a competitor to Five Guys, Steak 'n Shake, and In-N-Out Burger. "Carl Hardee Sr." is also expected to become the new company spokesperson. The campaign also introduced modernized logos for both Carl's Jr. and Hardee's.

=== The Call of Carl's campaign ===
In 2018, CKE resumed producing separate campaigns for their Hardee's and Carl's Jr. brands. For Carl's Jr., it started The Call of Carl's campaign featuring the voice of Academy Award-winning actor Matthew McConaughey.

== See also ==
- Hardee's
- List of hamburger restaurants
