= Margaret Karcher =

American fast-food pioneer

- Born: Margaret Magdalen Heinz; March 2, 1915; Big River, Wisconsin, U.S.
- Died: June 6, 2006 (aged 91); Scottsdale, Arizona, U.S.
- Occupation: Entrepreneur
- Spouse: Carl Karcher (1939–2006; his death)

Margaret Magdalen Heinz Karcher (March 2, 1915 – June 6, 2006) was an American fast-food pioneer who co-founded the Carl's Jr. hamburger chain with her husband Carl Karcher, which today is owned by parent company CKE Restaurants.

Karcher and her husband started their first business, a hot dog stand, on July 17, 1941, in Los Angeles, California, when they borrowed $311 against their Plymouth automobile and added $15 from Margaret's purse. The stand initially sold hot dogs and Mexican tamales. On January 16, 1945, they opened their first restaurant, Carl's Drive-In Barbecue in Anaheim, California. They also opened Carl's Jr.

Their restaurant quickly grew and they opened several more restaurants, numbering 100 by 1974 and more than 300 by 1981.
