= Duane C. Butcher =

American diplomat

Duane Clemens Butcher (born 1965) is a retired American diplomat who last served as the executive director of the Bureau of African Affairs at the Department of State. Immediately prior, he served as the director of the Office of Overseas Employment, and before that as the director of the Office of Planning and Administration. Butcher served as chargé d'affaires at U.S. Embassy Bucharest from December 2012 to July 2014 and as the deputy chief of Mission from August 2011 to July 2012. He also served as chargé d'affaires at the U.S. Embassy in Tashkent, Uzbekistan from July 2010 to June 2011.

== Personal life and education ==
The son of a U.S. diplomat, Butcher was born in Ankara, Turkey. He attended international schools in Germany, Saudi Arabia, and Sweden, graduating from high school at the American International School of Nairobi. He graduated from Carleton College in 1987 with a BA in history. Butcher is married and has two sons.

== Career ==
Butcher began his diplomatic career in 1987 and is a career member of the Senior U.S. Foreign Service.

As chargé d'affaires in Bucharest, Butcher has worked to strengthen bilateral relations across a wide range of issues, promoting the rule of law and judicial independence, advocating for U.S. companies and an improved business climate, and deepening military cooperation. Butcher served as the chairman of the board of the American International School of Bucharest. Butcher received the National Order of the Star of Romania, the country's highest civil award, July 16, 2014. The Bucharest School of Political Science and Administration awarded Butcher an honorary doctoral degree.

Butcher served as Deputy Chief of Mission from June 2008 to July 2010 and Chargé d'affaires ad interim (CDA) from July 2010 to June 2011 in Tashkent, Uzbekistan. Prior to his service in Tashkent, DCM Butcher was Consul General in Hamburg, Germany from 2004 to 2007. Butcher served overseas as Management Counselor in Belgrade, Yugoslavia from 2001 to 2004; Administrative Officer in Bucharest, Romania from 2000 to 2001 and in Baku, Azerbaijan from 1994 to 1996; and as General Services Officer in Muscat, Oman from 1988 to 1990. In Washington, D.C., he served as Post Management Officer and Senior Post Management Officer for the newly independent states in the Executive Office of the Bureau of European Affairs (1996–1998). He has received U.S. State Department Superior Honor and Meritorious Honor awards.
