= Advance Auto Parts =

American auto parts retailer

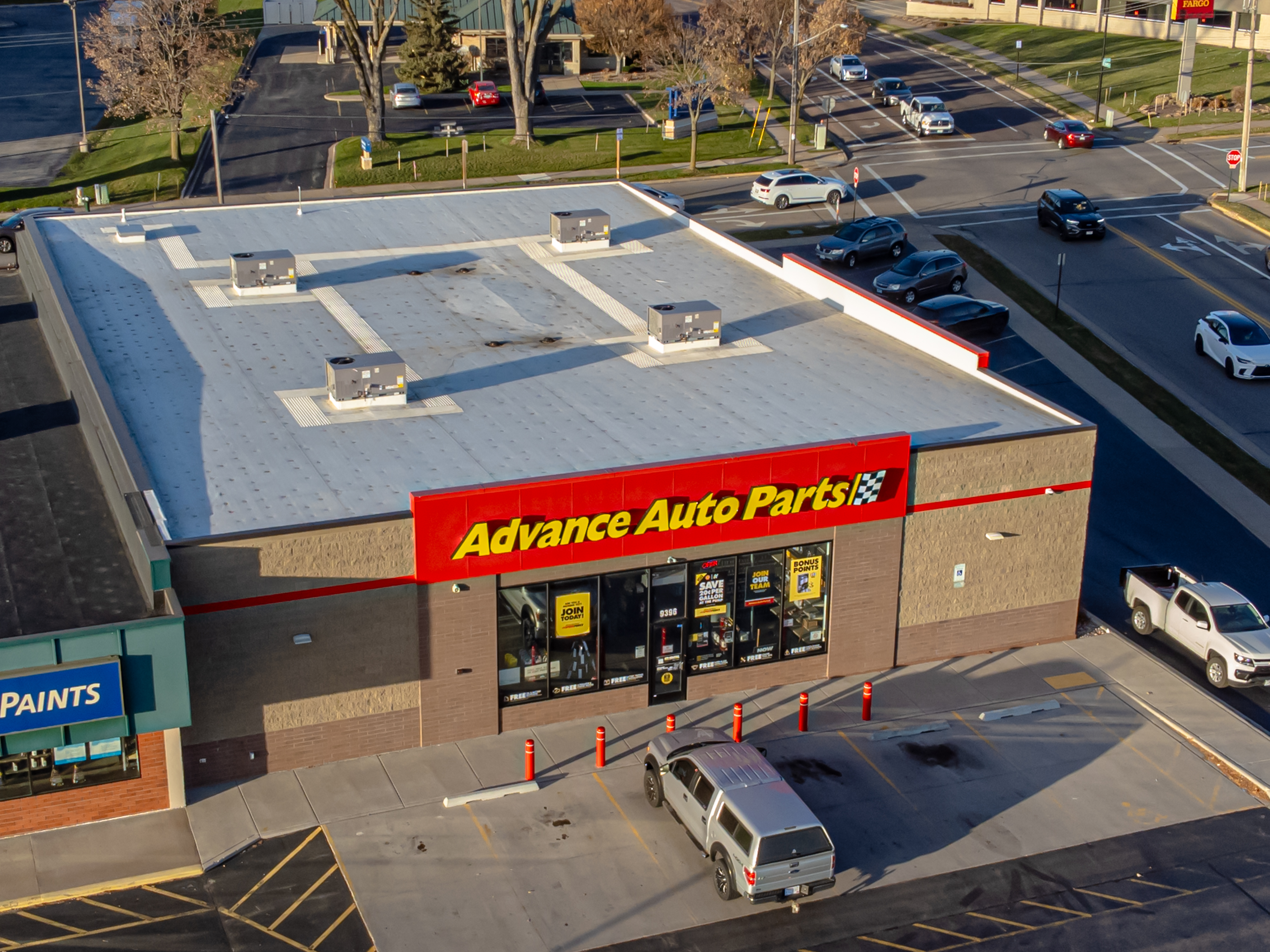
- Advance Auto Parts in La Crosse, Wisconsin
- Type: Public
- Traded as: NYSE: AAP; S&P 600 component
- Industry: Auto Parts Retail
- Founded: April 29, 1932; 94 years ago
- Founder: Arthur Taubman
- Headquarters: Raleigh, North Carolina, U.S.
- Number of locations: 4,305 Advance and Carquest stores; 809 independent locations (2025)
- Area served: United States; Canada
- Key people: Eugene I. Lee, Jr. (chairman); Shane O'Kelly (CEO, president); Ryan Grimsland (CFO)
- Products: Replacement automotive parts & accessories
- Revenue: ▼US$8.60 billion (2025)
- Operating income: ▲US$−43 million (2025)
- Net income: ▲US$44 million (2025)
- Total assets: ▲US$11.8 billion (2025)
- Total equity: ▲US$2.20 billion (2025)
- Number of employees: 54,047 (2025)
- Subsidiaries: Carquest
- Website: advanceautoparts.com

Advance Auto Parts is an American automotive aftermarket parts provider. Headquartered in Raleigh, North Carolina, it serves professional installer and do it yourself (DIY) customers.

== History ==
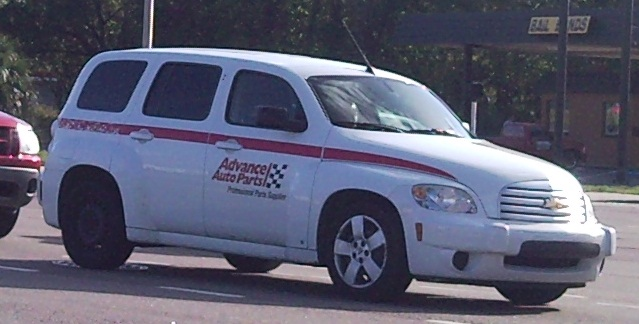
2006-2010 Chevrolet HHR used as the fleet vehicle of the company.

In April 1932, Arthur Taubman purchased the Advance Stores from Pep Boys, with two stores in Roanoke, Virginia, and one in Lynchburg, Virginia. Advance premiered on the Fortune 500 list of companies in 2003 at No. 466. In January 2005, Advance was named the “Best Managed Company in America” in the retail sector by Forbes. In July 2018, the corporation was ranked at No. 1,412 on the Forbes "World's Biggest Public Companies" list. Advance ranked No. 326 on the 2019 Fortune 500 list and No. 415 in 2024. The company retails various brand name, original equipment manufacturer (OEM) and private label automotive replacement parts, accessories, batteries and maintenance items for domestic and imported cars, vans, sport utility vehicles and light and heavy duty trucks. Owned private label brands include Argos and Diehard batteries.

Advance Auto Parts shares are mainly held by institutional investors such as The Vanguard Group, BlackRock, State Street Corporation, and others. The first major expansion of Advance Auto Parts was in 1998 when the company acquired the remaining operations of Western Auto, an auto parts and general store retailer. Most of the Western Auto operations had been taken over by Sears, Roebuck and Co. in 1987. Then, in April 2001, Advance Auto Parts acquired Carport Auto Parts, a regional retail chain with 29 stores in Alabama and Mississippi. On November 28, Advance acquired Discount Auto Parts, Inc., a regional auto parts chain with 671 stores in Florida, Alabama, Georgia, South Carolina, and Louisiana. Upon completion of this merger, Advance Auto Parts became a publicly traded company, listed as a common stock on the New York Stock Exchange under the symbol AAP. The year ended with 2,484 stores in 38 states.

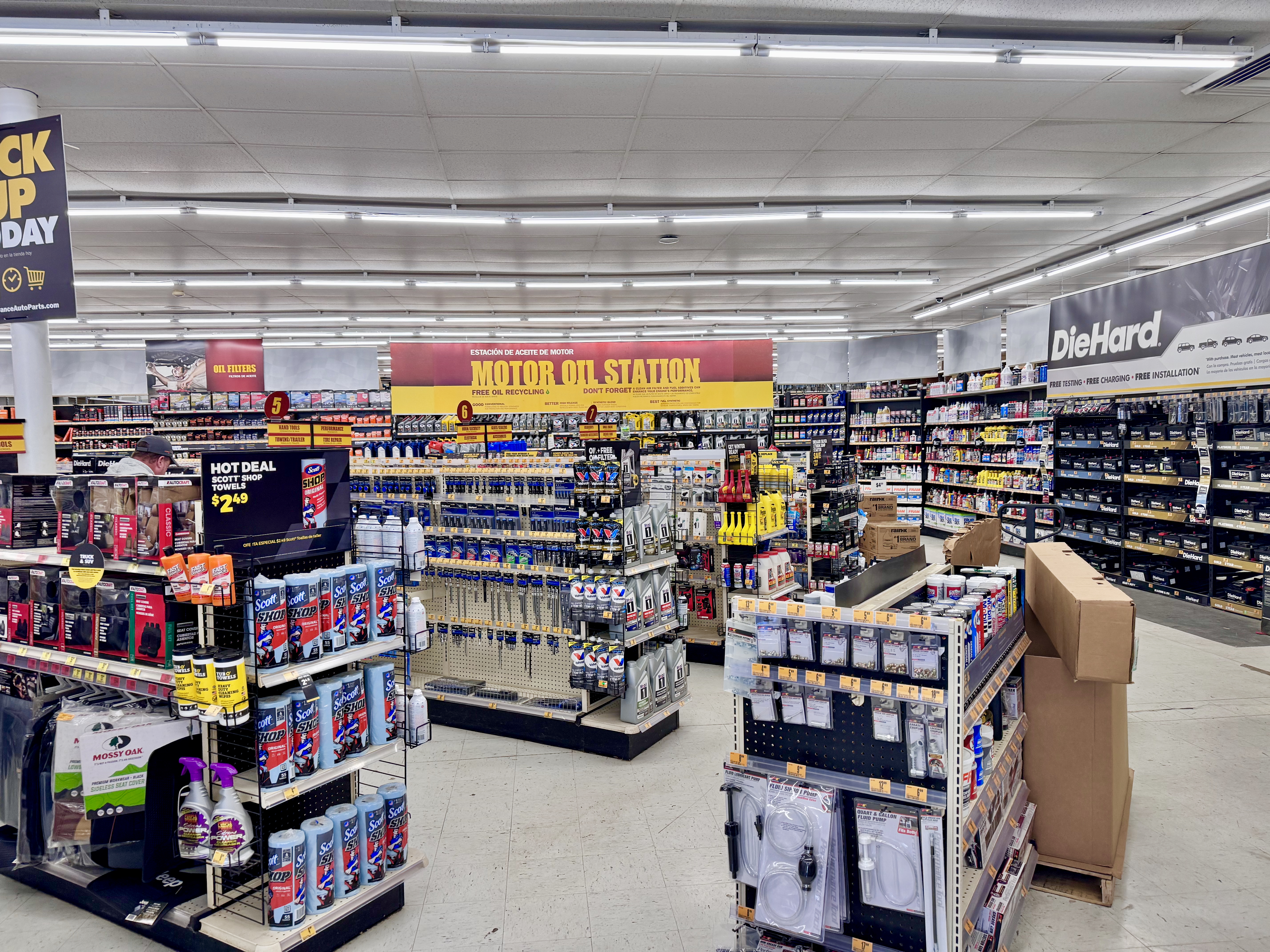
Interior of an Advance Auto Parts store in Cherokee County, North Carolina.

In July 2002, Advance Auto Parts received bankruptcy court approval to acquire 57 Trak Auto stores in northern Virginia, Washington, DC, and eastern Maryland.

In December 2012, Advance Auto Parts acquired BWP Distributors—a Carquest franchise for the New England region—that included the transfer of 124 company owned retail locations plus 2 distribution centers. The responsibility for 92 independently owned locations that were service by BWP were transferred to General Parts, Inc., the largest Carquest franchise along with one distribution center for servicing those locations. Advance Auto Parts entered into a definitive agreement to acquire General Parts International, Inc. (GPI), a privately held distributor and supplier of equipment and aftermarket replacement products for commercial markets operating under the Carquest and WorldPac brands on October 16, 2013. The deal created the largest automotive aftermarket parts provider in North America. GPI, headquartered in Raleigh, North Carolina, has seen a significant rise in personnel since being acquired by Advance. The acquisition was completed on January 3, 2014.

On September 30, 2015, Starboard Value LP, an activist investment firm disclosed they had taken a 3.7 percent stake in Advance Auto Parts. On January 2, 2016, Darren Jackson resigned his position as CEO. On April 4, 2016, Advance announced Frito-Lay North America CEO Tom Greco would succeed Jackson as CEO. Advance stock declined throughout 2016 and 2017, but in 2018 Advance was the #5 top performing stock of the S&P 500 outperforming the aftermarket automotive parts industry by more than 30 percent. In November 2018, Advance Auto Parts announced the relocation of its headquarters from Roanoke, Virginia to Raleigh, North Carolina. On December 23, 2019, Advance Auto Parts announced its purchase of the DieHard battery brand from Sears in a $200 million, all-cash deal. To promote the acquisition and availability of the brand at Advance and Carquest, the company hired Die Hard actor Bruce Willis to be part of a promotional film that was released during the 2020 holiday season.

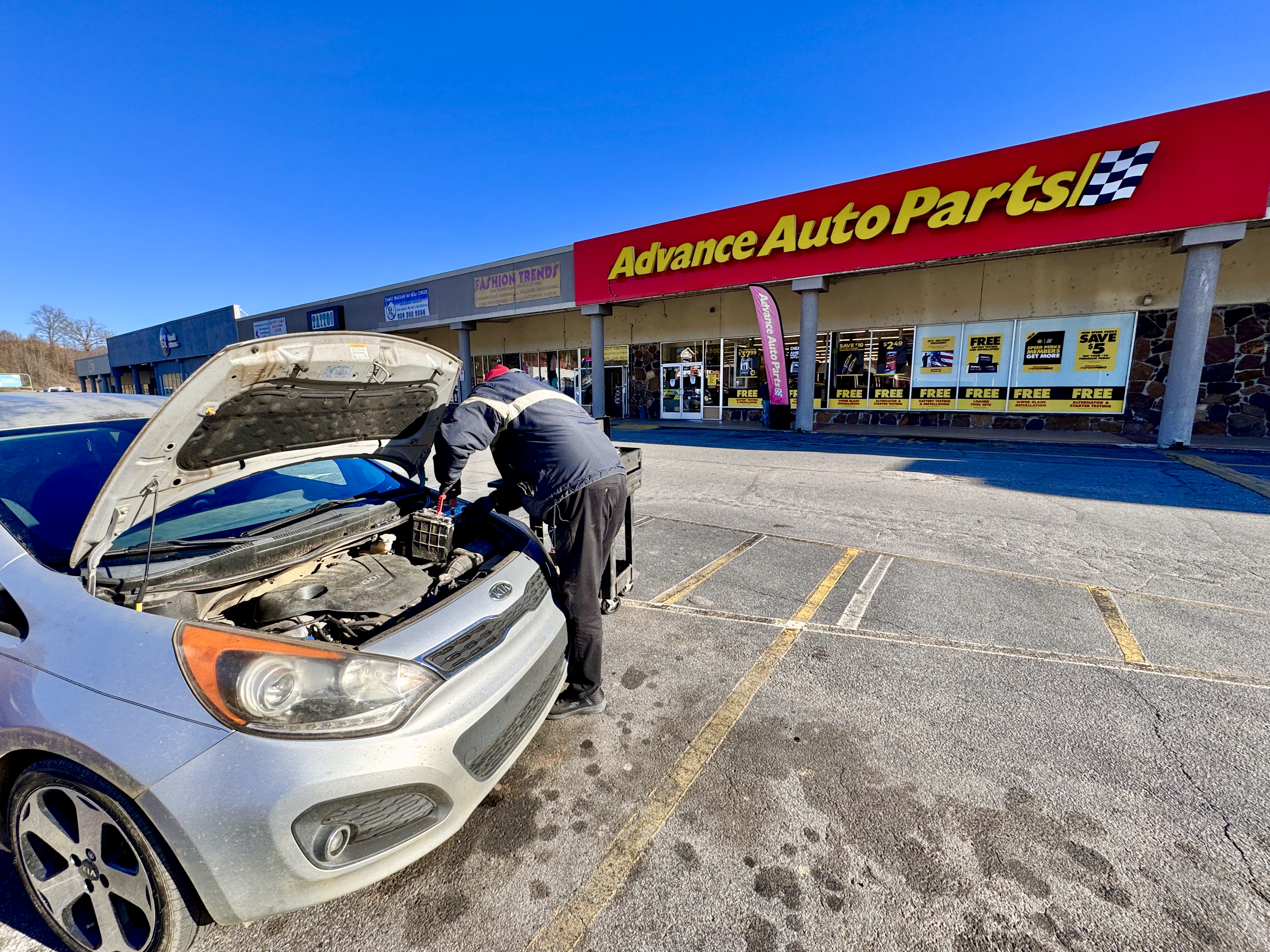
An Advance Auto Parts employee changes a car battery in front of the store.

In March 2021, Advance announced its plans to lease the retail space of 109 Pep Boys stores in California and convert them to Advance stores, enabling the company to expand its retail footprint in a strategic market. On September 11, 2023, Shane O'Kelly succeeded Tom Greco as president and CEO of Advance.

Greco announced his planned retirement earlier in the year. In November 2023, Advance Auto Parts announced it is exploring the sale of Worldpac and its Canadian business. In March 2024, Advance Auto Parts announced it appointed three new directors to its board and reached cooperation agreements with activist investors Third Point and Saddle Point Management. The investors then owned a five percent stake in Advance Auto Parts. The company was joined by Brent Windom, ex-CEO of Uni-Select, Gregory Smith, executive vice president at medical device company Medtronic and Thomas Seboldt, who worked at O'Reilly Automotive. In August 2024, Advance Auto Parts announced it had sold Worldpac to the investment firm Carlyle for $1.5 billion.

The closing of the Worldpac sale was announced on November 4, 2024. In November 2024, Advance Auto Parts announced it would close four distribution centers, 523 corporate stores and 204 independent locations as part of a major restructuring strategy the company is undertaking. All stores in California are closed as of March 2025 The overhaul is expected to cost the company between $350 million and $750 million. In July 2024, Advance Auto Parts announced a data breach which included the theft of personally identifiable information (PII) of nearly 3 million customers. The stolen data included customer and employee names, social security numbers, birthdates, and other private information. The data breach was part of the mass Snowflake Inc. data breach campaign.

== Corporate affairs ==
=== Headquarters ===
Since 2020, Advance Auto Parts has been headquartered in a tower in the North Hills area in Raleigh, North Carolina.

== Motorsport sponsorships ==
From 2009 to 2013, Advance Auto Parts was a title sponsor of Monster Jam and sponsored a truck on the circuit called the Advance Auto Parts Grinder. In 2023, Advance Auto Parts took over as the official sponsor of the checkered flag in IndyCar. Advance Auto Parts has served as a sponsor in NASCAR, where it is the official auto parts retailer of the sanctioning body.

The company sponsored the 2017 Advance Auto Parts Clash exhibition race at Daytona International Speedway. Advance became the title sponsor of the NASCAR Advance Auto Parts Weekly Series in 2020.

=== Teams ===
Advance Auto Parts has partnered in the past with racing teams as well, such as Cruz Pedregon, Alex Bowman, Tommy Baldwin Racing, and JR Motorsports.

Advance became the primary sponsor of NHRA Funny Car driver Courtney Force, the winningest female Funny Car driver in the history, in December 2016. The agreement ran through the entire 2017 and 2018 seasons. Force's sister, Brittany Force, driving her dragster was sponsored by Advance for the 2019 NHRA season. Current sponsorships include Team Penske (with driver Ryan Blaney) in NASCAR; and Josh Hart who represents Advance's TechNet Professional brand in the Top Fuel class of NHRA.

== See also ==
- AutoZone
- O'Reilly Auto Parts
- National Automotive Parts Association (NAPA)
- SCO v. AutoZone
