= Stradling Yocca Carlson & Rauth =

Law firm

- Headquarters: Newport Beach, California
- No. of offices: 10
- No. of attorneys: ~130
- No. of employees: ~275
- Major practice areas: General practice
- Date founded: 1975
- Founder: Nick Yocca, C. Craig Carlson, Bill Rauth, K.C. Schaaf
- Company type: Professional corporation
- Website: www.sycr.com

Stradling Yocca Carlson & Rauth, founded in 1975, is a law firm headquartered in Newport Beach, California. The firm focuses on areas of law such as corporate law including mergers and acquisitions, business litigation, intellectual property, labor and employment, real estate, public law, and tax.

The firm has more than 120 attorneys with offices in Austin, Denver, Los Angeles, Santa Barbara, Sacramento, San Francisco, and Seattle.

In addition, the firm works on infrastructure finance across California and in Washington, Nevada, Texas, Colorado, and Hawaii.

The firm was founded in 1975 by Nick Yocca, C. Craig Carlson, Bill Rauth and K.C. Schaaf.
