= Ren Powell =

American poet

Ren (Katherine) Powell (born Karen Lee Tudor in Anaheim, California) is an American-born Norwegian poet and translator.

== Career ==
Powell has translated more than a dozen book-length publications for various publishers. Contemporary Norwegian poets she has worked with include Odveig Klyve, Tor Obrestad, Kolbein Falkeid, Einar O. Risa, Gunnar Roalkvam, Finn Øglænd, Jon Fosse and Mansur Rajih. She has been a member of The Norwegian Authors' Union since 2005, when she was also awarded an Emerging Writer's Grant. Her poetry collections have been purchased by the Arts Council Norway for national library distribution.

She has taught theater and drama at Lundehaugen and Vågen schools for visual and performing arts for over a decade. She has also worked as a graduate adviser at Prescott College's Masters program, which emphasizes community service as part of their teaching ethos.

From 2005 to 2008, Powell served as the Norwegian PEN representative for the International PEN Women Writers' Committee. She also helped establish the International Cities of Refuge Network, and is the founding editor of the online literary journals Protest Poems.org, and Writing Under the Influence. She is currently an associate editor for Poemeleon.

Ren Powell has taught writing workshops for teens and adults, funded by a grant from the Arts Council Norway, Sølvberget and Stavanger and Sandnes municipalities. She currently publishes multi-media poetry work through her own company Mad Orphan Lit.

== Background ==
Powell moved 42 times and changed her name three times before settling in Norway in 1992. Powell has a BA in Theater Arts from Texas A&M University (United States), and an MA and PhD in Creative Writing from Lancaster University (England).

In accordance with Norwegian citizenship rules, which did not permit dual citizenship at the time, Powell renounced US citizenship in 2013.

== Selected works ==
- Fairy Tales and Soil: Gravid Poems (bilingual edition 1998 with translations by Tor Obrestad)
- Mixed States (Wigestrand, bilingual edition 2004 with translations by Eirik Lodén.)
- An Intimate Retribution (Wigestrand, bilingual edition 2010 with translations by Eirik Lodén.)
- An Elastic State of Mind: D.L.D.'s Autobiography in Poems (Wigestrand, bilingual edition 2012 with translations by Eirik Lodén)
- "The Elephants Have Been Singing All Along" (Wigestrand, bilingual edition 2017 with translations by Eirik Lodén)
- Mercy Island: New and Selected Poems (Phoenicia Publishing, 2011)
- Impermanence (Mad Orphan Lit., Hand-bound Book, 2021)
