= Santa Barbara Restaurant Group =

Defunct restaurant holding company

- Formerly: GB Foods (1986–1988)
- Type: Public
- Traded as: Nasdaq: SBRG
- Industry: Restaurant chains holding company
- Predecessor: Green Burrito
- Founded: 1986; 40 years ago in California as GB Foods
- Defunct: February 1, 2002; 24 years ago
- Fate: Acquired by CKE Restaurants
- Successor: CKE Restaurants
- Headquarters: Santa Barbara, California, US
- Area served: United States
- Key people: William P. Foley
- Subsidiaries: Green Burrito; La Salsa; JB's Restaurants; Timber Lodge Steakhouse

Santa Barbara Restaurant Group was a restaurant holding company and was the parent company for the Green Burrito, La Salsa, JB's Restaurants, and the Timber Lodge Steakhouse restaurant chain.

The Santa Barbara Restaurant Group was originally created in 1986 as GB Foods Inc. to serve as the holding company for the Green Burrito fast-food Mexican restaurant chain. A large change in the company occurred when William P. Foley, the chairman for CKE Restaurants acquired a controlling interest in the company in 1997 and converted the company from a holding company that controlled a single chain to one that controlled many chains. The following year, GB Foods changed its name to the Santa Barbara Restaurant Group and started to acquire other restaurant chains, such as the Timber Lodge Steakhouse and in a different transaction, JB's Restaurants and other restaurants chains that were once a part of CKE.

After two years of negotiations, La Salsa was acquired in June 1999.

To focus on Mexican fast food and steakhouses, the JB's Restaurants chain was sold off to a group of investors that included JB's managers in 2000.

In March 2002, Santa Barbara Restaurant Group was acquired by CKE Restaurants in a swap of company stock. At the time of the acquisition, both companies shared many board members and Santa Barbara Restaurant Group operated 56 La Salsa restaurants, 25 Timber Lodge Steakhouse restaurants, and 5 Green Burrito restaurants while also franchising 39 La Salsa restaurants, 30 Green Burrito stand-alone restaurants, one Timber Lodge Steakhouse restaurant and 195 Green Burrito dual-concept restaurants. CKE was also the largest franchisee of the Green Burrito concept, all of which were sharing space at selected Carl's Jr. locations at the time of the acquisition, so the result of the acquisition made it easier for CKE to expand the Green Burrito dual-brand concept to additional Carl's Jr. locations. To better focus on the fast food industry, CKE quickly sold off Timber Lodge to a consortium headed by Timber Lodge managers in 2004. CKE was not very successful in expanding the La Salsa concept to new territories before it gave up and sold the chain to Baja Fresh in 2007.
