= Carl Karcher =

American businessman, founded Carl's Jr.

Carl Karcher SMOM
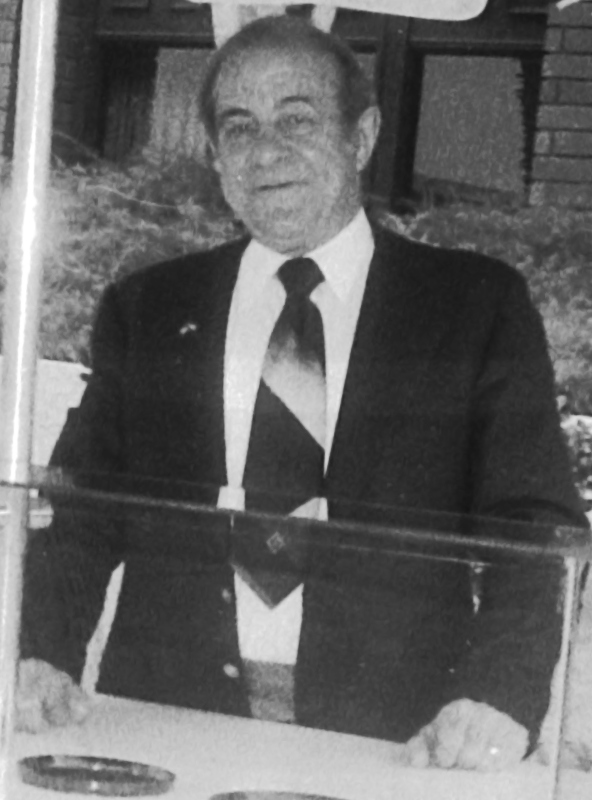
- Karcher in 1981
- Born: Carl Nicholas Karcher; January 16, 1917; Upper Sandusky, Ohio, U.S.
- Died: January 11, 2008 (aged 90); Fullerton, California, U.S.
- Resting place: Holy Sepulchre Cemetery, Orange, California
- Occupation: Entrepreneur
- Years active: 1941–1993
- Spouse: Margaret Karcher (m. 1939–2006; her death)

Carl Nicholas Karcher SMOM (January 16, 1917 – January 11, 2008) was an American businessman who founded the Carl's Jr. hamburger chain, now owned by parent company CKE Restaurants. Karcher served in the U.S. military during WWII.

== Early life ==
Born on a farm near Upper Sandusky, Ohio, Karcher was the son of Ohio natives Leo and Anna Maria (Kuntz) Karcher. Leo Karcher's grandparents immigrated from Belgium; Anna Maria Kuntz was of German ancestry. Carl N. Karcher moved to Anaheim, California, where his uncle ran a small business. He was hired by his uncle and worked for him for three years, and later dropped that job to work at a bakery as a delivery boy which increased his weekly salary by $6. He married Margaret Magdalen Heinz Karcher in 1939.

== Restaurant business ==
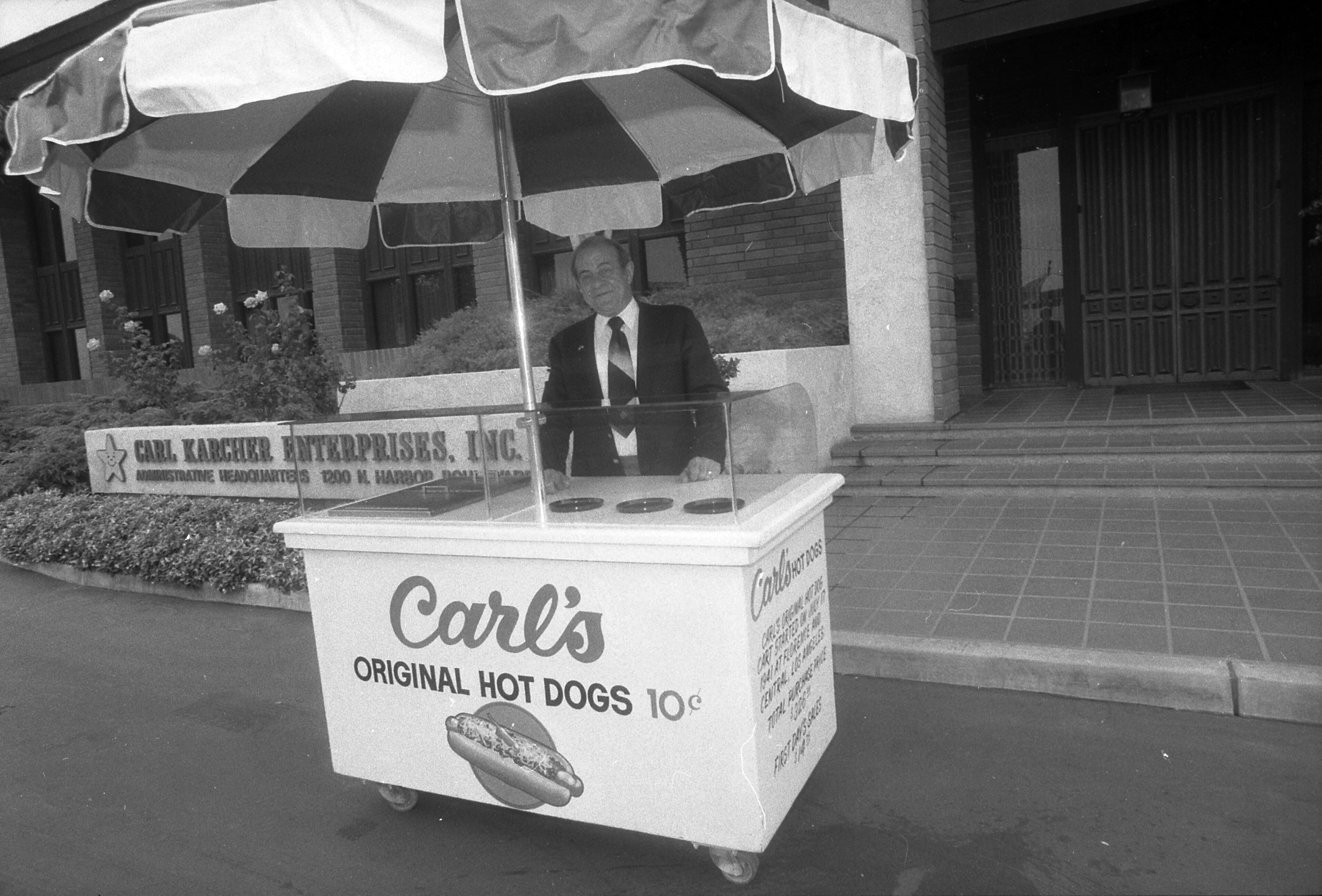
Karcher in 1981 with a replica of his original hot dog cart

Karcher and his wife started their first business, a hot dog stand, on July 17, 1941, in Los Angeles when they borrowed $311 against their Plymouth automobile and added $15 from Margaret's purse. The stand initially sold hot dogs and Mexican tamales. There was a brief hiatus on his business due to his enlistment in the U.S. Army during WWII. Upon his return as a veteran, on his 28th birthday, January 16, 1945, they opened their first restaurant, Carl's Drive-In Barbecue, in Anaheim.

Their restaurant quickly expanded, with the restaurants numbering 100 by 1974 and over 300 by 1981. Karcher was investigated and sued by the Securities and Exchange Commission for insider trading after allegedly telling family members to sell their stock in advance of a poor earnings report. Karcher settled the case in July 1989 for $664,000.

Karcher was chairman and CEO until 1993, when the board of directors voted him out, with a statement that he pushed corporate strategy that was "motivated by his personal financial difficulties". Karcher had lost money in real estate and other investments and defaulted on $30 million in personal bank loans. About two-thirds of his company stock was pledged as security for those loans.

Karcher denied accusations about both his motivations and that he had financial trouble. He decried his situation to the media and a spokesman told the Los Angeles Times: "This is a man with hamburger flowing through his veins."

Karcher objected to the sexualized nature of the Carl's Jr. ad campaigns of the 2000s, and was said to have been "heartbroken that a company he founded on Christian principles has taken such an amoral act."

Karcher died on January 11, 2008, from complications of Parkinson's disease, at age 90.

== Awards ==
Karcher received numerous awards for his philanthropy, including, in 1979, the Horatio Alger Award "for his distinction in accomplishments through individual initiative, hard work and adherence to traditional ideals."

Karcher was a member of the Knights of Malta. He also received the Pope John XXIII Award from the Italian Catholic Federation for "best exemplifying benevolent, philosophical and charitable principles."

On January 16, 2007, his 90th birthday, Karcher and his deceased wife Margaret were recognized with the placement of a star on the Anaheim/Orange County Walk of Stars.

== Personal life ==
Karcher was a devout Catholic and an active member of the Sovereign Military Order of Malta. He attended mass daily at St. Boniface Catholic Church in Anaheim prior to going to work at his office. Carl and Margaret had 12 children. Their son, Jerome T. Karcher, who is a priest in the Roman Catholic Diocese of Orange, received the Man of Character Award from the Boy Scouts of America for founding Mercy House in Orange County for the homeless.

== Political activities ==
Karcher was a lifelong supporter of conservative causes and was known to lead the Pledge of Allegiance to the American flag at the beginning of CKE board meetings.

Karcher was an early supporter of John Schmitz, a Republican and member of the John Birch Society, who represented Orange County in the California State Senate and later Congress. Schmitz was the presidential nominee of the American Independent Party in 1972.

In 1978, he contributed US$1 million to California's Proposition 6 initiative, also known as the Briggs Initiative, which would have banned LGBT people from serving in California public schools. He was the initiative's biggest financial supporter.
