= CKE Restaurants =

American restaurant company

CKE Restaurants Holdings, Inc.
- Type: Private
- Industry: Restaurants
- Founded: 1956; 70 years ago in Anaheim, California, US
- Founder: Carl Karcher
- Headquarters: Franklin, Tennessee, US
- Key people: Joe Guith (CEO)
- Revenue: ▲US$1.280 billion (2012)
- Operating income: ▲US$68.897 million (2012)
- Net income: ▲US$-6.261 million (2012)
- Total assets: ▼US$1.480 billion (2012)
- Total equity: ▼US$414.7 million (2012)
- Number of employees: 20,200 (Jan 2012)
- Parent: Roark Capital
- Subsidiaries: Carl's Jr.; Hardee's; Green Burrito; Red Burrito
- Website: ckr.com

CKE Restaurants Holdings, Inc. (an acronym for Carl Karcher Enterprises) is an American fast food corporation and is the parent organization for the Carl's Jr., Hardee's, Green Burrito, and Red Burrito brands. CKE Restaurants is headquartered in Franklin, Tennessee.

In October 2020, CKE Restaurants operated or franchised to locations in 44 US states and 43 foreign countries and US territories.

== History ==
=== 1940s ===
In 1941, Carl's Jr. founder, Carl Karcher, entered the fast food market by purchasing a hot dog cart in Los Angeles.

=== 1950s ===
In 1956, Karcher opened the first Carl's Jr. restaurants in Anaheim and Brea, California.

=== 1990s ===
In 1996, CKE acquired Rally's and Taco Bueno. The plan was to rebranded Rally's into the Carl's Jr. imaging, though they determined later in the year that Rally's was not suitable.

In 1997, CKE acquired Hardee's from Canadian-based company Imasco. By 1998, CKE rebranded Hardee's into the Carl's Jr. imaging including the Happy Star logo and parts of its lunch menu but kept the Hardee's name and left the breakfast menu intact.

Rally's was later sold to Checkers in 1999. Checkers and Rally's then followed a similar regionalization concept as CKE has for its Carl's Jr. and Hardee's chains. Taco Bueno was sold in 2001 when private investment group Jacobson Partners purchased the chain for US$72.5 million dollars to help aid CKE Restaurants in a debt battle.

=== 2000s ===
In September 2000, Andrew Puzder was named CEO. Prior to becoming the CEO, Puzder had been the personal attorney to the founder Karcher since 1986.

In March 2002, CKE purchased Santa Barbara Restaurant Group (SBRG) and acquired direct ownership of the Green Burrito brand as part of the sale.

=== 2010s ===
On February 26, 2010, THL Partners agreed to acquire CKE Restaurants. However, CKE Restaurants was, instead, acquired by Columbia Lake Acquisition Holdings, an affiliate of Apollo Management VII in July 2010, after CKE accepted a $693.9 million takeover offer from Apollo Global Management, ending the earlier takeover agreement with THL Partners.

On November 20, 2013, Roark Capital Group acquired a piece of CKE from Apollo Global Management for $1.65–$1.75 billion.

On March 4, 2016, CKE Restaurants Holdings announced that they would be consolidating their corporate offices in St. Louis, Missouri, and Carpinteria, California, and moving them to Franklin, Tennessee. CKE's Anaheim, California, office remained open until it was consolidated with the Franklin headquarters in 2018, with most of the Anaheim office's jobs outsourced to India and the Philippines.

In December 2016 Andrew Puzder was nominated by President-elect Donald Trump as US Secretary of Labor and resigned from CKE Restaurants as CEO in March 2017. Puzder ultimately withdrew from the nomination after his own admission of hiring an undocumented immigrant, failing to pay taxes and controversy from his companies' labor violations became public during the confirmation process.

On March 21, 2017, CKE announced the selection of Jason Marker as CEO for the company, succeeding Andrew Puzder. Marker, a New Zealand native, had previously served as the president of Kentucky Fried Chicken US, a subsidiary of Yum! Brands which is a direct competitor to CKE Restaurants. In June 2018, Marker was the subject of an age discrimination suit by a 58-year-old CKE marketing employee who was terminated in 2017 after 16 years of employment and had relocated with the company to Tennessee. The suit alleged Marker "began to publicly and privately display his shock and disgust with the fact that the CKE executive and management team consisted primarily of employees over the age of 50.", with Marker reportedly saying it was "depressing" and "something had to be done" about it. The suit also listed four top officials in the company over 50 who had been replaced by younger employees.

On April 12, 2019, Ned Lyerly was named CEO and appointed to CKE's board of directors. Lyerly had worked with CKE for over 30 years at the time of his appointment and was previously the president of CKE's international operations.

=== 2020s ===
On March 17, 2023, CKE announced the appointment of Max Wetzel as Chief Executive Officer, effective immediately. Wetzel was previously Chief Operating Officer of Papa John's International, Inc., one of the largest franchisors of restaurants in the world, with over 5,000 restaurants across 48 countries and territories.

=== Fundraising ===
CKE conducts an annual Stars for Heroes in-store fundraising campaign by soliciting donations from customers at both Hardee's and Carl's Jr. restaurants to benefit US military veterans and their families. Since the program's launch in 2011, Stars for Heroes raised nearly US$5 million by 2015.

== International ==
As of October 2020, there were over 3,800 franchised or company-operated restaurants in 44 US states and 43 foreign countries and US territories.

== Criticisms and controversies ==
=== Hypersexualized ads ===
The 2005 launch of a commercial of Paris Hilton sensually washing a Bentley in a bikini, marked the start of Carl's Jr. and Hardee's supermodel-centric marketing strategy. Since then Carl's Jr. ads have featured a number of female celebrities including Heidi Klum, Kim Kardashian, Kate Upton, and Katherine Webb. A study found that 52 percent of viewers surveyed found a Carl's Jr. commercial starring bombshell Charlotte McKinney offensive. Carl's Jr. is led by parent company CKE Restaurants Holdings, and from 2000 to 2017, CKE was run by Andrew F. Pudzer, who was a very vocal advocate of the racy ads.

By the end of 2019, the company decided to change their advertising direction after partnering up with 72andSunny advertising agency. "Our plan moving forward is really about how to keep food at the center of what we're doing," said Chad Crawford, CKE's chief brands officer.

=== Animal welfare policies ===
In September 2007, after more than a year of discussions with PETA, CKE Restaurants announced a new animal welfare program that would phase in cage-free eggs, and began sourcing pork from suppliers that did not use gestation crates for pregnant pigs. The plan also gave consideration to poultry suppliers that were willing to use controlled-atmosphere killing, which was the most humane form of slaughter available.

In July 2016 CKE Restaurants announced that it would work to ensure that its pork supply is purchased from suppliers who use group housing methods for pigs. CKE also promised to switch to 100% cage-free eggs by 2025.

In December 2018 the chain became the first fast-food restaurant to serve Beyond Meat for breakfast, lunch, and dinner.
