= Big Boy named franchisees =

American fast food franchise

Logos of historical Big Boy franchisees. Franchisees were once required to use their own name with the Big Boy name and character. Some changed logos periodically and these show designs used while a Big Boy affiliate, most dating from the mid-1950s to the mid-1960s. Eat'n Park, Shoney's and JB's are no longer affiliated with Big Boy. Logos for Adler's, Arnold's, Bud's and Chez Chap were not available to the artist.

The Big Boy name, concept, menu, and mascot were originally licensed to a wide number of regional franchise holders. Because many of the early franchisees were already in the restaurant business when joining Big Boy, "Big Boy" was added to the franchisee name just as the Big Boy hamburger was added to the franchisee's menu. In this sense, it is confusing when referring to a chain, as each named franchisee was itself a chain and Big Boy could be considered a chain of chains.

People tend to know Big Boy not simply as Big Boy, but as the franchise from where they lived such as Bob's Big Boy in California, Shoney's Big Boy in the south, Frisch's Big Boy in much of Ohio, Indiana and Kentucky, Marc's Big Boy in the Upper Midwest, Elias Brothers' Big Boy (or sometimes just Elias Brothers') in Michigan, among many others.

Each regional franchisee typically operated a central commissary, which prepared or processed foods and sauces to be shipped fresh to their restaurants. However, some items might be prepared at the restaurants daily, such as soups and breading of seafood and onion rings.

== History ==
Through the 1950s and 1960s, the emphasis changed from drive-in restaurant to coffee shop and family restaurant. New franchisees without existing restaurants signed on. A larger standard menu was developed. Most adopted a common graphic design of menus and promotional items offered by Big Boy but personalized to the franchise. Stock plans of restaurant designs were provided by Los Angeles architects Armet and Davis or Chicago architectural designer Robert O. Burton and modified as needed.

In the 1960s, Big Boy and other drive-in restaurants could not compete with the spreading fast food restaurants such as McDonald's and Burger King. Big Boy built its last drive-in in 1964, and by 1976, only 5 of the chain's 930 restaurants offered curb service. Big Boy redefined itself as a full service restaurant in contrast to fast food. Nonetheless, in the late 1960s and 1970s, Bob's, Shoney's, and JB's also opened Big Boy Jr. stores, designed as fast food operations that offered a limited menu. Sometimes called drive-ins, these junior stores did not use carhops. In 1993, Marc's Big Boy similarly developed Big Boy Express stores using dual drive-thrus and no interior dining area. Two Express stores were built, offered for sale a year later and closed in 1995.

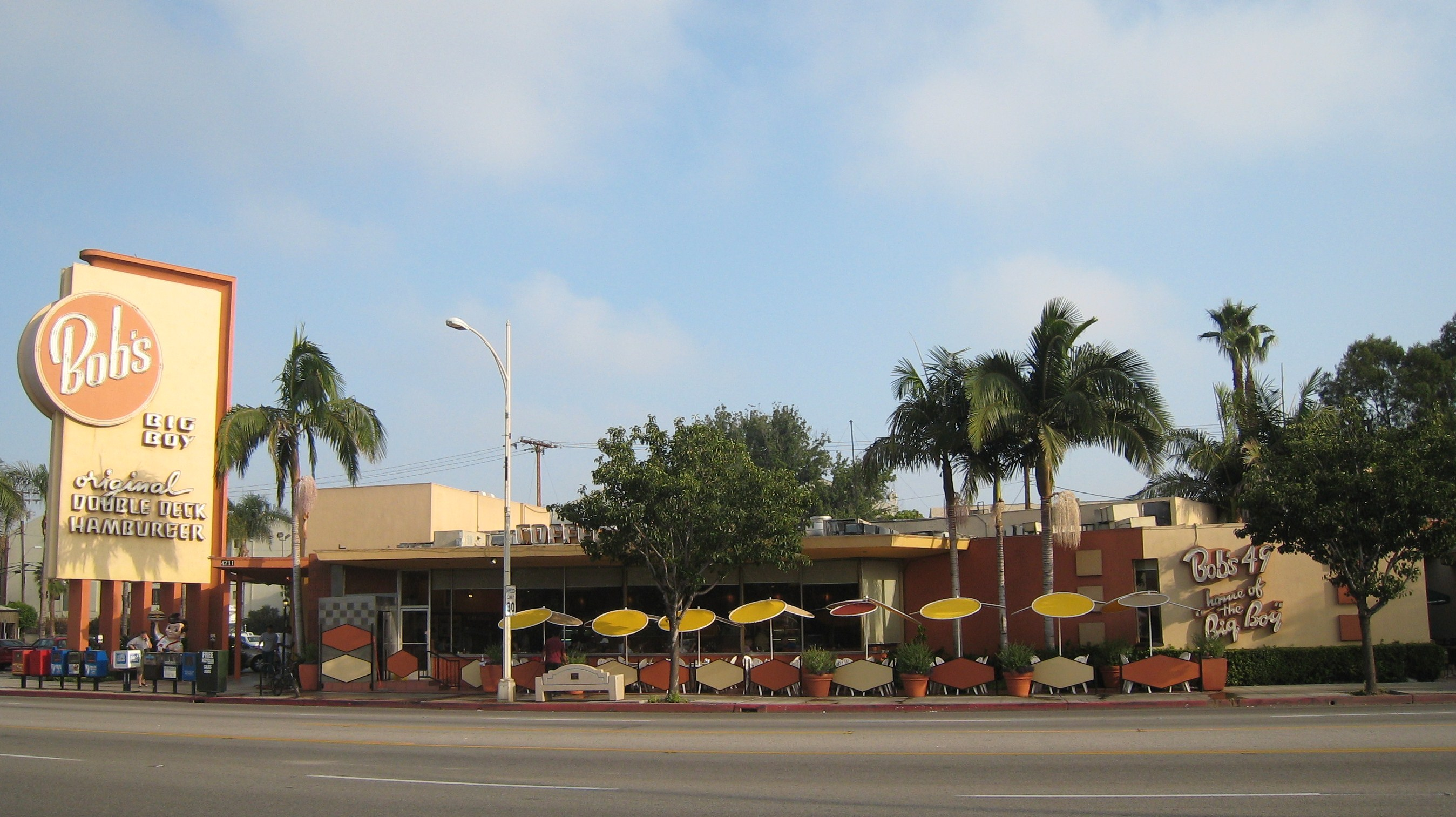
Bob's Big Boy restaurant in Burbank, California

Several franchises also held Kentucky Fried Chicken franchises and sold that chicken in their Big Boy restaurants; these included Marc's, McDowell's, Lendy's and one or more Shoney's subfranchises. The practice was discouraged, and Big Boy eventually provided a similar scheme of selling buckets of take-out chicken, marketed as Country Style or Country Cousin Chicken. Franchises who resisted the change were forced to remove Kentucky Fried Chicken menu items and physically relocate those operations. However, Marriott sold "Pappy Parker Fried Chicken" in Bob's Big Boys; the Marriott owned brand was also sold in the company's Hot Shoppes and Roy Rogers Restaurants, and later Marriott Hotel Restaurants.

Big Boy's origins as a drive-in restaurant required a much smaller investment to open and much lower costs to operate: a small building having no dining room or limited counter space. Thus, persons of modest assets could become Big Boy operators. It was the profits from these operations that allowed not only additional drive-ins but also operators to build modern restaurants with large, pleasant dining rooms. Many of the early successful franchisees would not have assets (converted to present value) sufficient to join Big Boy today.

By 1979, there were more than a thousand Big Boy restaurants in the U.S. and Canada and about 20 franchisees. Shoney's, Elias Brothers, and Frisch's—charter franchisees—controlled the vast majority. These mega franchisees paid practically no fees, e.g., Frisch paid $1 per year for its core four state territory. After Bob's, the four original franchisees (in order) were Frisch's, Eat'n Park, Shoney's (originally called "Parkette") and Elias Brothers, all clustered near the state of Ohio. All, including Bob's, remain in operation today, albeit Elias Brothers is simply known as Big Boy, and Eat'n Park and Shoney's dropped Big Boy affiliation in the 1970s and 1980s.

Big Boy developed named franchisees in several ways. Very quickly, the Big Boy name and even the Big Boy character were being widely used without permission. Bob Wian, needing Big Boy restaurants operating in multiple states to maintain national (U.S.) trademark protection, offered very generous franchise agreements to Frisch's, Eat'n Park and Parkette (Shoney's). In 1952, Wian instituted a formal franchise process, and Elias Brothers became the first such "official" franchisee, paying Wian 1% of sales. Bob Wian also settled trademark infringements allowing the rogue operator to become a licensed franchisee, such as McDowell's Big Boy in North Dakota. Franchisees were permitted to subfranchise; these early subfranchisees often used their own name and operated independently: Frisch's licensed Azar's, and Manners; Shoney's licensed Adler's, Arnold's, Becker's, Elby's, Lendy's, Shap's, Tune's, and Yoda's. (An eastern Pennsylvania Elby's franchisee briefly operated as Franklin's Big Boy before dropping Big Boy.)

Acquisitions and mergers also occurred. In the early 1970s, Frisch's acquired Kip's Big Boy; JB's acquired Vip's, Kebo's, Leo's and Bud's which were rebranded JB's. Shoney's acquired the Missouri territory previously assigned to Tote's. After buying Big Boy, Elias Brothers bought Elby's and TJ's. Elby's was unique in leaving and rejoining the Big Boy system. When Marriott purchased Big Boy (Wian Enterprises) in 1967, this included Bob's Big Boy. The name "Bob's" would be used by all Marriott-owned Big Boys and became common in parts of the eastern U.S. and elsewhere, far away from Bob's historic territory.

Frisch now owns the "Big Boy" name in a defined four-state region, and its franchisee Azar closed in 2020. Bob's is a licensed Big Boy Restaurant Group. Many of the other former franchise owners (Shoney's, particularly) have expanded into the former territories of other franchise holders.

After buying the Big Boy system from Marriott, Elias Brothers planned to phase out franchise names, only generally realized by Big Boy Restaurants International after 2000. This was intended to strengthen the trademark but also prevent defections, such as happened with Shoney's Big Boy retaining identity as Shoney's. The same occurred with Eat'n Park, Elby's, Lendy's, JB's, and Abdow's who kept their names after leaving Big Boy. Big Boy now permits operators to informally identify by location, such as Tawas Bay Big Boy in East Tawas, Michigan.

Unlike most modern franchises, the historic Big Boy franchisees differed somewhat from one another in pricing and menus. After purchasing Big Boy in 1987, Elias Brothers intended to standardize the name and menu, but Bob's, Frisch's, and McDowell's (now known as Bismarck Big Boy) continue to offer distinctions from the standard Big Boy menu.

== Roster of named operators ==
Big Boy restaurants were co-branded with at least 34 different names representing various franchisees. These franchisees are listed below with territories, time span, founders, comic book code (in brackets), and additional notes, as known:

=== Franchisors and independent operators ===
The parent franchisor company has changed over the system's lifetime: it was Bob's Big Boy from 1936 to 1967, first as an independent company, then under Marriott Corporation ownership after 1967; then Elias Brothers' Big Boy until 2000. Since 2001, control of the trademark in the U.S. has been split into two territories, between Big Boy Restaurants in most of the United States, and Frisch's Big Boy as an independent entity in a few states in the Midwest. Additionally, Big Boy Japan operates independently of the Big Boy Restaurant Group.

==== Bob's Big Boy ====
Bob's operated in California, Arizona, Nevada, Alaska, Hawaii, Washington, Oregon, Virginia, Maryland, Delaware, Pennsylvania, New Jersey, Vermont; and Indiana, Ohio, Florida, New York and Pennsylvania toll roads and airport locations operated in several states by the Marriott Corp. or others, 1936+, founded by Robert C. "Bob" Wian

The original Big Boy chain, which in Wian's time was confined to Southern California, Arizona, and Nevada. Because Marriott developed and acquired Big Boy restaurants elsewhere, principally the northeastern U.S., Bob's developed a more diverse territory and identity. JB's Big Boy purchased Bob's in Nevada and Arizona. Currently, Bob's operates only five restaurants – all in Southern California. Bob's units are the only operators under the domain of the Big Boy Restaurant Group now permitted to use a franchise name for public identity. Wian was the original chairman of the Big Boy Board of Directors. [A]

==== Elias Brothers' Big Boy ====
Elias Brothers operated in Michigan, Northeastern Ohio, Ontario, Canada, 1952–2000, founded by Fred, John and Louis Elias.

In 1938 the brothers opened Fred's Chili Bowl in Detroit and later the Dixie Drive-In in Hazel Park, which would become the first Elias Brothers Big Boy. Considered the "first official franchisee" because they were the first to apply to Bob Wian formally. They worked with Wian, Schoenbaum and Manfred Bernhard to create the 1956 Big Boy character design and launch the comic book. Owned the Big Boy system from 1987 through 2000, when the bankrupt company was sold to Robert Liggett. Many Michigan units continue operations stripped of the Elias Brothers name, and these are the vast majority (90%) of Big Boy Restaurant Group's Big Boy stores. Fred Elias became a member of the Big Boy Board of Directors. [F]

==== Big Boy Restaurants ====
As of April 2024, Big Boy Restaurant Group operates 55 total locations in the United States: 51 "Big Boy" branded restaurants in Michigan, Nevada, North Dakota, and Ohio; and four additional locations in California branded as "Bob's Big Boy". One Big Boy location also operates in Thailand.

==== Frisch's Big Boy ====
Frisch's operates in Ohio, Kentucky, Indiana, and owns rights to most of Tennessee. It operated in Florida until the early 1990s, 1947+, founded by David Frisch.

The Cincinnati restaurant chain and first franchisee began serving Big Boy hamburgers in 1946 but opened their first Big Boy Drive-In restaurant in 1948; Frisch's now operates 31 Big Boys, all of which are franchised. 11 are franchised to other owners, while the rest are franchised to either Don Short or Cheryl White, current managers of the company. Frisch's subfranchised to Azar's and Manners, which used the Frisch's styled Big Boy, to Milton and David Bennett in 1955, who operate as Frisch's in northwest Ohio and also licensed Elby's to operate three Big Boy units in the upper Ohio Valley until 1971. In 2001, Frisch's became the perpetual owner of the Big Boy trademark in most of Ohio, Kentucky, Indiana, and Tennessee and received $1.2 million to relinquish all other Big Boy territories to Big Boy Restaurants International, to whom Frisch's is no longer a franchisee or licensee. On August 24, 2015, Frisch's was sold to an Atlanta-based private equity fund, ending family ownership and control of the chain. [X]

==== Big Boy Japan ====
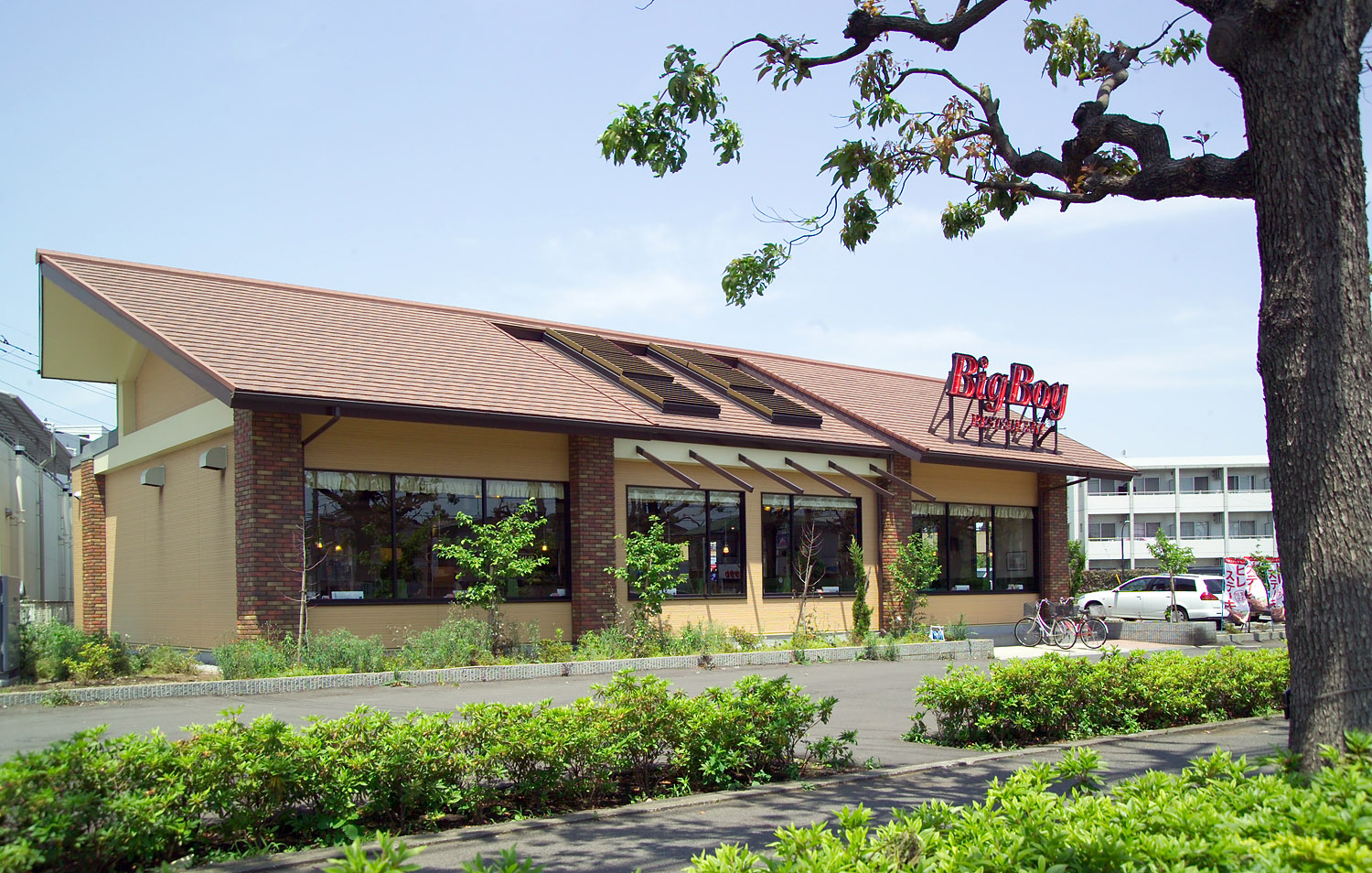
A Big Boy Restaurant in Chōfu, Tokyo, Japan

Outside of North America, Big Boy Japan owns and operates 274 Big Boy Hamburger Steak & Grill Restaurants in Japan. Founded in 1977, Big Boy Japan now also operates 45 Victoria Station restaurants in Japan and is a subsidiary of Zénsho Holdings Co., Ltd. The Japanese Big Boy Restaurants do not offer the Big Boy hamburger or most other American Big Boy menu items, offering a distinct menu instead. They also offer beer and wine. Zensho had purchased Big Boy Japan from the ailing Daiei in 2002 for 8.65 billion yen. Like Frisch, Big Boy Japan operates independently of the Big Boy Restaurant Group.

=== Franchises that became independent ===
- Abdow's (Western and Central Massachusetts, Connecticut, 1963–1994, founded by George and Ron Abdow and their sister Phyllis Abdow-LaVallee) Abdow's opened as a Hi-Boy franchisee in 1959, bought a Big Boy franchise in 1963 and changed the corporate name to Abdow's Big Boy in 1965. Abdow's left Big Boy in 1994 over menu conflicts with Elias Brothers and value served for the franchise fees, removing 18 restaurants from the national chain. Now defunct, many converted to Elxsi Corporations's Bickfords Family Restaurants or remain vacant. [N]
- Eat'n Park (metro Pittsburgh, 1949–1975, founded by Larry Hatch and William Peters) Hatch and Peters were supervisors at Isaly's in Pittsburgh. On Isaly's business in Cincinnati, Hatch saw the success of the Frisch's Big Boy Drive-In prompting contact with founder Bob Wian, who needed national exposure to gain national trademark protection. Within a year Eat'n Park opened as the second Big Boy franchisee. When the 25-year franchise agreement expired, Eat'n Park dropped Big Boy, attributed to the loss of drive-in popularity but primarily motivated by the end of the $1 per year license fee the franchise had enjoyed. Pittsburgh area Big Boy rights were reassigned to Elby's in 1977. [D]
- Elby's (Northern West Virginia, Pennsylvania, Eastern Ohio, Maryland, 1956–1984, 1988–2000, founded by brothers George, Ellis and Michael Boury) Named after a brand of flavoring syrup sold by the Bourys' restaurant supply business. (Note: Some sources say Elby's came from the childhood nickname of Ellis Boury.) Originally acquired the Big Boy rights to northern West Virginia through Shoney's. In 1960 Elby's expanded into Ohio, licensed through Frisch's. Six years later, Bob Wian awarded Elby's franchisor rights to Pennsylvania, excluding the Pittsburgh and Philadelphia areas; Pittsburgh was awarded Elby's in 1977. When Frisch's refused existing terms on a fourth Ohio unit in 1971, Elby's withdrew from Big Boy affiliation in Ohio, leading to a long running trademark battle by Frisch's. In August 1984 Elby's paid $500 thousand to buy out its Big Boy franchise, four months after Shoney's—franchisor for Elby's West Virginia stores—broke affiliation. (Note: George Boury referred to paying $500,000 to break their franchise agreement in the late 1970s. This occurred in 1984 and likely only involved restaurants in Pennsylvania, since West Virginia stores were subfranchises of Shoney's, who already bought out their franchise agreement in April 1984. Elby's Ohio stores were not affiliated with Big Boy.) Opened units in Maryland after leaving Big Boy. The Elby's name and most company restaurants were sold to Elias Brothers in 1988 becoming Big Boys again. (George and Michael Boury retained nine Ohio units that could not become Big Boys because of nearby Frisch's operations; they were rebranded as Shoney's restaurants until placed for sale in 1993.) Although officially stripped of the Elby's name, identity was so strong that the Elby's name continued in print advertisements. The last remaining Elby's closed in 2000 in response to the Elias Brothers financial crisis. [E]
- Franklin's (Eastern Pennsylvania, 1966–1976, founded by Marvin and Joseph Franklin) Subfranchised by and originally operated as Elby's. Sued Elby's in 1975 for receiving commissions from approved vendors. inflating prices of supplies, and using continued franchising as an incentive. Elby's denied the charges, which were settled out of court in 1978. Franklin discontinued use of the Elby's name in 1976, but initially continued to operate as Big Boy Restaurants. (Note: Franklin's continued to advertise the Big Boy hamburger and mascot—now with "Franklin's" on the mascot's chef hat—on March 15, 1977. A month later Franklin's advertised an unbranded "double-decker hamburger" instead. By February 1978, Franklin's began to advertise the "Big Ben" (Double-Decker) Hamburger.) Elby's sued Franklin's. In August 1978, a federal court cancelled Franklin's contracts with Elby's, awarded Elby's an undisclosed cash settlement and enjoined Franklin's from use of the "Elby's" and "Big Boy" names, food items, recipes and other materials. Nonetheless, Franklin's renamed the "Big Boy" the "Big Ben" and adopted a Benjamin Franklin theme. Elby's subsequently built new restaurants adjacent to several Franklin's units. The 12 unit chain was sold to Hershey's Foods and Friendly's Restaurants in 1985.
- JB's (Arizona, Utah, Idaho, Montana, South Dakota, Wyoming, Washington, California, New Mexico, Nevada, Nebraska, Kansas, New Jersey, Rhode Island, Massachusetts, Connecticut; 1961–1988, founded by Jack M. Broberg.) The first JB's Big Boy opened in 1961 in Provo, Utah. In the 1970s JB's expanded by acquiring neighboring Big Boy franchisees: Vip's, Leo's, Kebo's and Bud's. After Marriott refused granting additional territory, in 1984, JB's sued to leave Big Boy. The parties settled, JB's paying $7 million in exchange for additional territory, including central and northern California, Oregon, Washington, Nevada and Arizona where it operated as Bob's Big Boy; JB's also purchased 29 existing Bob's Big Boy restaurants from Marriott. Citing a lack of benefit except use of the Big Boy symbol for its over $1 million annual franchise fees, in 1988 JB's allowed its Big Boy franchise to expire, removing 110 units from the Big Boy system. As of December 2016, fifteen JB's Restaurants operate in five states. [H]
- Lendy's (Western Virginia, 1955–1964, founded by Leonard Goldstein) Owned by Goldstein but operated as Shoney's 1955–1959. Territory proximity to Yoda's angered Goldstein and concurrent franchise with Kentucky Fried Chicken antagonized franchisor Alex Schoenbaum, prompting Lendy's to leave Big Boy. Renamed the "Big Boy" hamburger as the "Buddy Boy" and created a Buddy Boy mascot similar to Frisch's Big Boy character. Goldstein replaced the Big Boy statues with statues of Buddy Boy.
- Marc's (Wisconsin, Iowa, Minnesota, Illinois, 1958–1995, founded by Ben Marcus and Gene Kilburg) Owned by the Marcus Corporation, Marc's Big Boy debuted in Milwaukee in November 1958. The chain grew to 4 units by 1962, and 22 units by 1970, doubling this number within 4 years and eventually operated as many as 64 Big Boys over a 4 state territory. Among these, acquiring Illinois Top's Big Boy restaurants by 1974—rebranding those in Chicago suburbs Marc's. In 1989, Marc's Big Boy Corporation was renamed Marc's Restaurants and a two-year experiment launched completely removing Big Boy at two of its stores, the test demonstrating no effect on business. In 1992, the Marc's format was upscaled and renamed Marc's Big Boy Cafes; in 1993 13 Big Boy Cafes were converted to Marc's Cafe and Coffee Mills, and the company launched 2 Big Boy Express drive-thru stores. (Note: Marc's Big Boy Express units were modeled on Rally's Hamburger stores which operated in the Midwest.) The following year, the 13 Cafe and Coffee Mill restaurants were sold to a group of employees, with 3 remaining Big Boys and 2 Big Boy Express units offered for sale. In 1995, the company closed its last Big Boy operation. Some former units later operated as Annie's American Cafe and as Perkins Restaurants. However, in 2017 the Marcus Corporation sold Big Boy hamburgers at the Kil@wat restaurant in its downtown Milwaukee hotel; in March 2017, the sandwich is priced at $11 on the lunch menu and $12 on the dinner menu both served with fries. [J] Now known as Aria Café and Bar at Saint Kate hotel, as of 2024 the Big Boy goes for $18. [J]
- Shoney's/Parkette (Tennessee, Alabama, Arkansas, Mississippi, Louisiana, Georgia, Virginia, South Carolina, North Carolina, West Virginia, Maryland, Missouri, New York, Philadelphia, PA, 1952–1984, (Note: Many sources mistakenly report that Shoney's began in 1959 because Ray Danner became a Shoney's Big Boy franchisee in 1959 and he is assumed to be the founder. However, Alex Shoenbaum founded the original Parkette in 1947 and became a Big Boy franchise in 1952. The matter is further confounded because after Schoenbaum changed the public name of his restaurants from "Parkette Big Boy Shoppes" to "Shoney's Big Boy" in 1954, the parent company remained named "Parkette Foods" until it merged with Ray Danner's company in 1971, then being renamed "Shoney's Big Boy Enterprises.) founded by Alex Schoenbaum), Originally called the Parkette, in 1952 it became Parkette Big Boy Shoppes. An unrelated "Parkette Drive-In" had opened in Kentucky so in 1954, a public contest for a new name resulted in Parkette becoming Shoney's, which was also a reference to founder Alex "Shoney" Schoenbaum. Shoney's also subfranchised to Arnold's, Becker's, Elby's, Lendy's, Shap's, Tune's, and Yoda's, and many using the Shoney's name. Ray Danner, the Nashville Shoney's franchisee purchased the company in 1971 and five years later dropped Big Boy from the company name. (Note: The company name was not always the name as used with the public. The company was named "Parkette Foods" until 1971, when Ray Danner changed it to "Shoney's Big Boy Enterprises". Writing about the 1976 name change the Charleston Daily Mail reported, "Top management ... believes Shoney's is much more than the southern reincarnation of the Frisch's Big Boy.") In April 1984 Shoney's—by then the largest Big Boy franchisee with 392 units—paid $13 million to break its contract with Big Boy, allowing expansion into Frisch's and other franchisees' Big Boy territories. Schoenbaum became a member of the Big Boy Board of Directors. [M] [P]

=== Other franchisees ===
- Adler's (Lynchburg, Virginia, 1958–1960, founded by Abe Adler) Became a Lendy's Big Boy, when Adler sold the business to Leonard Goldstein of Lendy's.
- Arnold's (Folsom, Pennsylvania, 1955–?, founders unknown) Arnold's and Tune's operated in the Philadelphia area.
- Azar's (Northern Indiana, Colorado, 1953–2020, (Note: Some sources, including a 1986 Azar's menu, say 1954.) founded by brothers Alex, David and George Azar) Opened in Ft. Wayne, Indiana, as a Frisch's subfranchise and in 1967 expanded to the Denver, Colorado, market. Operated 26 units in 1984. Alex Azar's son, George Azar, became CEO. After closing during the COVID-19 pandemic, the last Azar's Big Boy closed permanently. Alex Azar became a member of the Big Boy Board of Directors. [T]
- Becker's (Rochester and Buffalo, New York, 1956–1965, founded by Abe Becker) Shoney's opened a restaurant in Rochester in the mid-1950s which may have become Becker's Big Boy. By 1957, Becker's was operating four Big Boy restaurants in Greater Rochester. Trying to expand too quickly created a financial crisis and the end of the franchise.
- Bud's (Montana, Wyoming, 1966–197?) Operated two units. Acquired by JBs in the 1970s.
- Chez Chap (Westmount, a suburb of Montreal, Quebec, 1978–?, founded by Chapman Baehler) Baehler was Bob Wian's stepson.
- Don's (Burlington, Vermont, 1984, founded by Donald Allard) One of several chain restaurants operated by Allard. Restaurant was rebranded as Bob's Big Boy about 1986, and closed, with plans to construct a Red Lobster Restaurant on the site in 1991. As of 2020, there has been an Olive Garden on that site for some years.
- Frejlach's (Illinois, 1954–196?, founded by Irvin Frejlach) Added Big Boy to their established chain of ice cream shops. Unlike other franchisees, the stores did not directly use the Big Boy name; they remained Frejlach's Ice Cream Shoppes not Frejlach's Big Boy. The company also owned rights to McDonald's restaurants in Cook County (Chicago), Illinois which were sold back to Ray Kroc in 1956. Irvin's brother Lucian "Lou" Frejlach became a member of the Big Boy Board of Directors.
- JB's (Canada - Ontario, Alberta and Quebec, 1969–1979, founded by John Bitove Sr.) Bitove, a well-known Canadian businessman, was the franchisee for Canada generally, along with Roy Rogers Restaurants, both Marriott owned brands. JB's of Canada grew to 32 Big Boy restaurants before selling to Elias Brothers.
- Kebo's (Seattle and Tacoma, Washington area before JB's dba Bob's, ?–1974, founded by W. Keith Grant.) "Kebo" came from the owners, Keith, Ed and Bob. Two units were sold to JB's in 1974.
- Ken's (Maryland, Washington DC, 1963–?, founded by Bill Bemis) named in honor of Bill Bemis' father Ken Bemis, who founded the White Log Coffee Shop chain. Three Maryland Ken's Big Boys operated in 1969. "Ken's" became "Bob's" in the early 1970s. [K]
- Kip's (Texas, Oklahoma, Kansas, 1958–1991, founded Fred Bell, Thomas W. Holman and James Reed) Bell owned and operated Kip's of Texas, while Holman and Reed owned and operated Kip's of Oklahoma and Kansas. Acquired by Frisch's in 1972. Kip's territory was transferred to Big Boy Restaurants International in 2001. Bell became an original member of the Big Boy Board of Directors. [B]
- Leo's (Spokane, Washington, Montana, 1966–1971, founded by Leo A. Hansen Jr.) The first Leo's Big Boy opened in Great Falls, Montana in 1966. Grew to four units before being acquired by and renamed JB's in 1971, Hansen becoming a vice-president of JB's Big Boy.
- Manners (Northeastern Ohio (Cleveland TV market), 1954–1979, founded by Robert L. and Ramona Manners) Franchisee through Frisch's, used the Frisch styled mascot design. Like Frisch's, Manners was already established having opened Manners Drive-In in 1939, 15 years before becoming a Big Boy franchisee. Paid Frisch's $10 per month for each location. In 1968 Manners Big Boy was sold to Consolidated Foods (now known as Sara Lee Corporation). Marriott purchased the 39 units in 1974 and five years later dropped the name "Manners". Marriott sold 26 remaining restaurants to Elias Brothers in 1985. [W]
- Mark's (Hyattsville, Maryland, 1960–1962?) A single unit existed at 3050 East-West Parkway, Hyattsville, which was a Ken's Big Boy in 1964.
- McDowell's (North Dakota, 1954–1960 independently as "Big Boy Drive-Inn", 1960+ as franchise, founded by Harley McDowell) A trademark infringement suit against McDowell was filed by Wian in 1959 ultimately resulting in a franchise agreement. Operates exclusively as a drive through. McDowell's name was dropped and the remaining store is now called the Bismarck Big Boy. Along with Big Boy hamburgers, the single restaurant sells flying pizza-burgers and french fries by the pound with chicken gravy. [L]
- Mr. B's (New Hampshire, Vermont, Maine, 1963–1969, founded by Manfred Bernhard) Operated a restaurant in Keene, New Hampshire, and Brattleboro, Vermont.
- Shap's (Chattanooga, Tennessee, 1959–1964?, founded by I. Shapiro, Pem Cooley, and E. D. Latimer) Franchised by Shoney's. Shap's was abbreviated for Shapiro's. Operated two small units in Chattanooga. Latimer bought out the other partners and changed the name to its franchisor's, Shoney's.
- Ted's (Rhode Island, 1964–?, founded by Edmund D. Fuller III)
- TJ's (Rochester, Batavia and Syracuse, New York, 1972–?, founded by Anthony T. Kolinski, John Gazda and John Giamartino) Grew to 9 stores by 1986. TJ's was purchased by Big Boy (Elias Brothers). Elias closed 4 stores in 1992 and sold one Syracuse store to a local investor. It closed 3 more Syracuse restaurants in 1994.
- Tops (Illinois, 1956–1993, founded by Lucian Frejlach) Operated primarily in the suburbs of Chicago. By 1974, the Chicago area stores became Marc's Big Boys, while the central Illinois units remained Tops. [Q]
- Tote's (Missouri, 1964–197?, founded by Edward R. Todtenbier) Todtenbier was a Frisch's franchisee in Anderson, Indiana, and planned to open 33 Tote's Big Boys in Missouri, 9 in the St. Louis area. In 1972 the Missouri Big Boy territory was reassigned to Shoney's. [U]
- Tune's (Philadelphia and Levittown, Pennsylvania, 1956–1963, founded by Jack Engel) In the mid to late 1950s Alex Schoenbaum seeded various franchises including Tune's. Two drive-in restaurants opened. By the early 1960s, the Levittown unit closed and the other was rebranded as Shoney's.
- Vip's (New Mexico, Texas, Wyoming, 1962–1982. founded by Daniel T. Hogan and James O'Conner) Vip's Big Boy of New Mexico was acquired by JB's Big Boy in 1972 but continued using the Vip's name until rebranded in 1982. (An unrelated Vip's Restaurants of Salem, Oregon, was not a Big Boy franchisee but sold units to JB's Big Boy, which operated them as Bob's Big Boy. The non-Big Boy, Salem-based chain had 53 locations at its peak, all sold and rebranded, including 35 to Denny's in 1982 and 16 to JB's in 1984.) [R]
- Yoda's (Western Virginia, founded by Jack Young and Bill Schroeder) Young was Leonard Goldstein's (Lendy's) brother-in-law. Merged with Lendy's.

=== Unauthorized uses ===
Mady's Big Boy of Windsor, Ontario, was not a franchisee, though sometimes identified as one and using a similar looking mascot. In 1965 Bob Wian sued Mady's for trademark infringement but failed because (his) Big Boy was judged not widely known in Canada. The case is considered important in Canadian and international trademark law. In 1973 Elias Brothers bought Mady's and established an Elias Big Boy on Mady's original site. John Bitove Sr. owned the rights to Big Boy for the remainder of Canada, which he sold to Elias Brothers in 1979. During the mid to late 1980's there was one in Nassau, Bahamas.
