= Bindig =

Bindig is a surname. Notable people with the surname include:

- Bob Bindig (1920–2007), American cartoonist and comics historian
- Rudolf Bindig (born 1940), German politician
