= Big Boy Restaurants =

American restaurant chain

Big Boy Restaurant Group, LLC
- Logo as of 2020
- Trade name: Big Boy, Big Boy Restaurants
- Type: Private
- Industry: Casual dining; restaurant
- Predecessors: Big Boy Restaurants International, LLC; Bob's Pantry; Elias Brothers Restaurants, Inc. Marriott Corporation; Robert C. Wian Enterprises
- Founded: August 6, 1936; 90 years ago (as Bob's Pantry); Glendale, California, US
- Founder: Bob Wian
- Headquarters: Southfield, Michigan, US
- Number of locations: 45 (2026)
- Area served: Michigan (38); California (4; as Bob's Big Boy); Ohio (2); North Dakota (1); Outside of US; Thailand; Independent; Indiana, Kentucky, and Ohio (31; as Frisch's Big Boy); Japan (as Big Boy Japan)
- Key people: Tamer Afr (CEO, 2020–present); David B. Crawford (CEO, 2018–2020); Bruce Ferguson (CFO); Robert Liggett Jr. (Chairman, 2000–2018)
- Products: Big Boy hamburger; Brawny Lad sandwich; Hot fudge cake; Slim Jim sandwich; Strawberry pie; Fish and chips
- Website: bigboy.com

Big Boy is an American casual dining restaurant chain headquartered in Southfield, Michigan; it is currently operated in most of the United States by Big Boy Restaurant Group, LLC.

The signature Big Boy hamburger is the original double-deck hamburger, which started as a joke. The Big Boy consists of two thin beef patties placed on a three-layer bun with lettuce, a single slice of American cheese, and either mayonnaise and red relish, and Big Boy special sauce or tartar sauce on one or more layers of bun. The early franchises also contributed signature menu items.

The restaurant chain's it mascot is a chubby boy with a pompadour hairstyle, wearing red-and-white checkered overalls and holding a Big Boy sandwich. The design has been modified through the years, and differing from the Frisch's Big Boy mascot design. Restaurants typically displayed had a statue of the mascot outside the store. Promotional comic books were also created based on the mascot.

As of May 2025, Big Boy Restaurant Group operates 45 total locations in the US. One Big Boy location also operates in Thailand. Frisch's operates 31 Big Boy restaurants in the US, of which 13 are franchised. Big Boy Japan, also independent of Big Boy Restaurant Group, operates 274 restaurants in Japan.

The Big Boy name, design aesthetic, and menu were previously licensed to a number of similarly-named regional franchisees. The parent franchisor company has changed over the system's lifetime: it was Bob's Big Boy from 1936 to 1967, then Marriott Corporation until 1987, then Elias Brothers' Big Boy until 2000. Since 2001, control of the trademark in the US has been split into two territories, between Big Boy Restaurants in most of the country, and Frisch's Big Boy as an independent entity in a few states in the Midwest.

== Food ==
=== The Big Boy hamburger ===
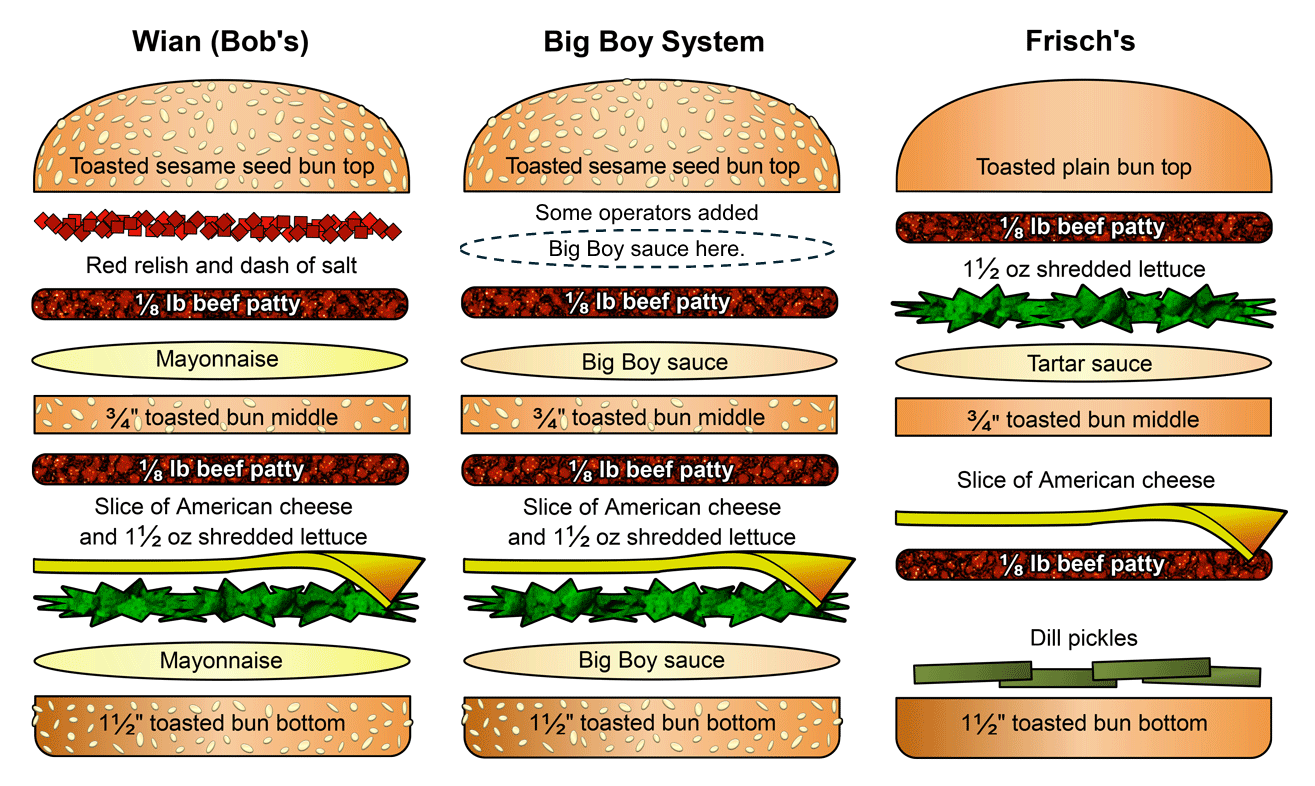
An illustration showing how Big Boy hamburgers are assembled. The original version developed by Bob Wian (left) has mayonnaise and red relish (a combination of pickle relish, ketchup and chili sauce). Frisch's version (right) replaces them with tartar sauce and dill pickles, and applies them in a different order. The worldwide Big Boy system version (center) instead uses a Thousand Island-type dressing advertised as Big Boy special sauce.

The signature Big Boy hamburger is the original double-deck hamburger. The novel hamburger started as a joke. In February 1937 some local big band musicians, who were regular customers of Bob's Pantry in Glendale, California, visited the restaurant. When ordering, bass player Stewie Strange asked, "How about something different, something special?" (Note: Exactly which band was involved is unclear. Hansen said Strange was a member of the Chuck Foster Orchestra. However, Rick Brough in The Newspaper (Park City, Utah) said Strange was a road musician with the Harry Lewis Dance Band. Lawrence quoted Wian saying it was the Glendale High School Orchestra, while Searl quoted Wian simply saying it was a big band that Wian used to rehearse with.) Bob Wian improvised, creating the first (then unnamed) Big Boy, intending it to "look ridiculous, like a leaning tower". Demand for the special soared and Wian sought a "snappy" name, which became Big Boy. (Note: Some reports say the Big Boy was first called the Fat Boy hamburger until discovering Fat Boy was a protected trademark.) In 1938, the Big Boy hamburger cost 15¢ (equivalent to $2.68 in 2018). In 2018, the Big Boy cost $6.49 in Michigan. Several slogans were used from the 1950s through the 1970s to promote the hamburger, such as A Meal in One on a Double–Deck Bun and Twice as Big, Twice as Good. On menus from that period it was called the "Nationally Famous, Original Double–Deck Hamburger".

The Big Boy hamburger inspired and was the model for other double deck hamburgers, including McDonald's Big Mac, Burger Chef's Big Shef and Burger King's Big King.

The Big Boy consists of two thin beef patties placed on a three-layer bun with lettuce, a single slice of American cheese, and either mayonnaise and red relish (a combination of sweet pickle relish, ketchup and chili sauce), and Big Boy special sauce (Thousand Island dressing) or (at Frisch's, Manners and Azar's) tartar sauce on one or more layers of bun. Regardless, the Big Boy condiment used was often simply referred to as special sauce on menus chainwide. Wian used a sesame seed bun while Frisch's uses a plain bun and included pickles. (Note: Frisch's placed pickles above bun bottom, and Manners below the bun top.) The Big Boy hamburger originally called for a quarter pound (4 ounces) of fresh ground beef, but later – at an unspecified date – franchisees were permitted to use frozen beef patties, and the minimum content reduced to a fifth of a pound to offset increasing food costs. Other specifications were exacting, such as the bun's bottom section being 1½ inches high and the center section ¾ inches, and 1½ ounces of shredded lettuce used.

Originally, the Big Boy hamburger was the only menu item required of all Big Boy franchisees.

=== Other core menu items ===
Just as Wian's Big Boy hamburger was served by all franchises, the early franchises also contributed signature menu items. Frisch's provided the Brawny Lad and Swiss Miss hamburgers, Shoney's contributed the Slim Jim sandwich and hot fudge ice cream cake, while strawberry pie was introduced by Eat'n Park. The hot fudge cake and strawberry pie remain popular dessert items chainwide, but other items were not necessarily offered by all franchises, which would also sometimes change item names: The Slim Jim became the Buddie Boy at Frisch's, and Elby's renamed the Swiss Miss as the Brawny Swiss. Similarly, when franchisees left Big Boy they would typically rebrand the Big Boy hamburger: it became the Superburger at Eat'n Park, the Buddy Boy at Lendy's, the Big Ben at Franklin's, and the Elby Double Deck hamburger at Elby's. Shoney's introduced the Classic Double Decker, somewhat different from the Big Boy, about a decade after leaving.

Big Boy offers breakfast, burgers and sandwiches, salads, dinner combinations, and various desserts.

== Mascot ==
Big Boy logo used from 1988 to 2020, featuring the Big Boy mascot and still seen at many locations

The restaurant chain is best known for its mascot, a chubby boy with a pompadour hairstyle, wearing red-and-white checkered overalls and holding a Big Boy sandwich. The inspiration for the restaurant's name, as well as the model for its mascot, was Richard Woodruff of Glendale, California. When he was six years old, Woodruff walked into the diner Bob's Pantry as Wian was attempting to name his new hamburger. Wian said, "Hello, Big Boy" to Woodruff, and the name stuck. Warner Bros. animation artist Ben Washam sketched Richard's caricature, which became the original character seen on the company trademark. (Note: Shoes were added to Washam's bare-footed Big Boy sketch.)

In 1955, Wian hired Manfred Bernhard, son of graphic designer Lucian Bernhard, to create a new public image for Big Boy. Bernhard was not impressed with Washam's mascot, saying it was sloppy and had a "moronic expression". The West Coast Big Boy mascot was revised, fiberglass statues were molded, schemes were created for menus and building designs, and a comic book for children was launched.

In 1951, Wian's original franchisee Dave Frisch developed a slightly different Big Boy character. He was slimmer, wore a side cap, saddle shoes and striped overalls. Having reddish or blonde hair, he was portrayed in a running pose. (Note: "Big Boy" was not written on the chest of the East Coast mascot. It was written on the side cap in the comic book, but otherwise was on the sleeve, and the franchise name was written on the side cap.) Known as the East Coast Big Boy, he was copyrighted by Frisch's and used for statues and comic books for the franchise and its subfranchisees Manners and Azar's. Before 1954, Parkette (Shoney's) used both versions, though never together. Since 1956, the Wian West Coast Big Boy design was used exclusively by all franchisees other than Frisch's, Manners and Azar's. In the late 1960s, both characters were redrawn to appear similar, incorporating the checkered outfit, pompadour and hamburger above the raised arm from the West Coast design, and the running pose and direction of the East Coast design. In the 1980s, the hamburger was removed from the West Coast design; representing a de-emphasis of the hamburger in North American Big Boy restaurants, it also accommodated the Japanese Big Boy restaurants, which do not serve hamburgers on a bun.

In 1985, concerned that the Big Boy mascot had become dated, Marriott Corporation put its fate up for a public vote, which was overwhelmingly in favor of keeping it.

=== Big Boy statues ===
The evolution of the Big Boy mascot: A / 1937: The first Big Boy (left) was derived from a sketch by Warner Brothers animation artist Bennie Washam in 1937. A frequent customer, Washam doodled the character on a napkin for Wian for a free lunch. The logo, redrawn holding a hamburger (right), was typically used by Wian and several early franchisees: Parkette (Shoney's), Elias Brothers and Frejlach's. The orientation was also reversed.; B / 1952: Wian's first franchisee, David Frisch, developed his own Big Boy character. Dated 1952, the design was copyrighted in 1951 and became known as the East Coast Big Boy. It was the model for statues used by Frisch's and subfranchisees Azar's and Manners. This Big Boy varied between blond and reddish blond hair. Unlike West Coast designs (A) and (C) it held the hamburger in both hands and was always portrayed running to its left.; C / 1956: The modern Big Boy character and the model for the fiberglass statues. It replaced Wian's original figure (A), and was seen in 1955 Shoney's advertisements. Typically drawn with the hamburger atop his right arm. Shown is a common version of several renderings used. By 2009, a new version was being used by some locations.; D / 1969: Revised East Coast Big Boy; E / 1969: Revised West Coast Big Boy; Differences between the East and West Coast designs, including the statues, created confusion along the Ohio–Michigan border where Frisch's and Elias Brothers operated. This motivated a common Big Boy mark, derived with elements of both predecessors, (B) and (C). It retained the look of the West Coast figure (C) but assumed the running pose and orientation of the East Coast figure (B). Nonetheless, similar West and East Coast versions were realized, maintaining the facial style of the previous marks, respectively. Frisch's continued to use (D) through 2016.: F / 1981: To emphasize a full menu the hamburger was removed from the West Coast design; G / 1988: After buying Big Boy, Elias Brothers lowered the left arm

Early versions of the West Coast Big Boy statues were large, measuring up to 16 feet (4.9 m) tall with later versions as short as 4 feet (1.2 m). The early statues always included the Big Boy hamburger above the mascot's raised right arm; much later versions eliminated the hamburger with both arms clutching the suspenders instead. The hamburger remained a part of the Frisch's East Coast statues, though the slingshot was eliminated from the figure's back pocket. Although still used by that chain, some Frisch's restaurants currently display the West Coast statue instead.

Occasionally Big Boy statues have come into conflict with local zoning ordinances. In 2002, Tony Matar, a Big Boy franchisee in Canton, Michigan, was cited in violation of local sign ordinances. The town claimed the statue was a prohibited second sign; Matar asserted that the 7-foot (2.1 m) statue was a sculpture, not a sign. A 2004 compromise allows the existing statue to remain with the words Big Boy removed from the figure's bib. When a Brighton, Michigan, franchise closed in early 2015 for financial reasons, zoning codes caused the entire sign – topped with a rotating Big Boy statue – to be taken down before the restaurant could be reopened. In contrast, the planning commission in Norco, California – known as Horsetown USA – was concerned that the statue was not Western enough. In response, the restaurant's Big Boy statue was outfitted with a cowboy hat and boots.

A few other modified statues are in official use. In Cincinnati's Great American Ball Park, a Frisch's statue is painted wearing a 1970s Reds baseball uniform with a Reds ballcap added. Frisch's Big Boy hamburgers are sold at two of the park's concession booths. Rather than modifying a typical statue, the Big Boy restaurants in Manistique and St. Ignace, Michigan, display full scale moose statues dressed in checkered overalls with Big Boy printed across the chest. To conform with Gaylord, Michigan's Alpine theme, the local restaurant's statue previously wore a green Tyrolean hat. The restaurant was rebuilt in 2016 without the modified statue.

In March 2017, Frisch's unveiled a restyled statue. The new statue resembles the West Coast design but wears striped overalls like the original East Coast Big Boy. The debut statue wearing a Reds uniform is placed near the existing statue at Great American Ball Park; another is planned for an unnamed Frisch's restaurant. Frisch's will gradually swap the new statues for existing restaurant statues in need of repair.

Because of the closing or separation of former Big Boy restaurants, many West Coast statues were acquired by private individuals, and often traded through eBay. Smaller versions of the statues are sold as coin banks and bobblehead figures. The three-dimensional Big Boy figure was also used on early ashtrays, salt and pepper shakers, wooden counter displays and as small unpainted pewter models.

Gigantic air inflatable Big Boy figures exist and are typically used for restaurant openings and special promotions.

=== Adventures of the Big Boy comic book ===
The Adventures of the Big Boy comic book: Top row (left to right): No. 1, July 1956, West Coast and East Coast versions; No. 13, July 1957, West Coast and East Coast versions.; Bottom row: No. 155, June 1969, West Coast and East Coast versions; No. 156, July 1969, combined version; No. 1, Shoney's version, 1976 (month unknown).

Adventures of the Big Boy (initially The Adventures of Big Boy) was a promotional comic book given free to children visiting the restaurants. Intended to "give the kids something to do while they waited for their food", the book involves the escapades of Big Boy, his girlfriend Dolly and dog Nugget. From the comic books, children could also join the Big Boy Club, a kids' club offering them free hamburgers, decoder cards, pin-back buttons and other premiums. The serial – sometimes called King of the Giveaways – once had distribution estimated at three million copies.

Manfred Bernhard commissioned Timely Comics to produce the book. In the first year, Adventures of the Big Boy was managed by Sol Brodsky, written by Stan Lee and drawn by Bill Everett, Brodsky, and Dan DeCarlo. (Note: Mike Sekowsky may have also drawn in the first year.) DeCarlo continued drawing in the second year and Lee wrote the series through 1961. (Note: Lettering in early issues was credited to Artie Simek; coloring and possibly some drawing was by Stan Goldberg.) For 17 years, starting in the mid-1970s, Manny Stallman drew the (Marriott) series, followed by Bob Bindig who drew the series until 1995. (Note: Lorina Mapa drew Adventures of the Big Boy, she said for five years; Jerry Buckley also drew several issues at the end of the run.)

Because of the distinct East and West Coast Big Boy mascots, dual versions of Adventures were produced, identical except for the detail of the Big Boy figure. In July 1969, the versions merged, and a fluffy brown haired Big Boy appeared. In 1976, Shoney's began publishing their own series instead. (Note: However, a January 1977 edition (#237) of the original series bears the Shoney's imprint.) Contracted to Paragon Products, this version featured an older, leaner Big Boy, with his siblings Katie and Tripp replacing Dolly and Nugget, and was adopted by the JB's and Azar's franchises. After 75 issues, it became Shoney's Fun and Adventure Magazine introducing a Shoney's mascot (the Uncle Ed bear) in place of Big Boy, allowing it to serve Shoney's non-Big Boy restaurants. (Note: Comic book artist Sheldon Moldoff drew Adventures of the Shoney's Big Boy from 1980 past the conversion to the Shoney's Fun and Adventure Magazine.)

In 1996, after 39 years and 466 issues, Big Boy cancelled the comic book and hired Craig Yoe's Yoe! Studio to revamp the characters and produce a magazine-styled replacement. After 63 issues, the Big Boy Magazine was itself cancelled in 2008.

== Regional franchises ==
Logos of historical Big Boy franchisees: Franchisees were once required to use their own name with the Big Boy name and character. Some changed logos periodically; the designs shown were used while a Big Boy affiliate, most dating from the mid-1950s to the mid-1960s. Eat'n Park, Shoney's and JB's are no longer affiliated with Big Boy. Logos for Adler's, Arnold's, Bud's and Chez Chap are not shown.

As of May 2025, Big Boy Restaurant Group operates 45 total locations in the US. One Big Boy location also operates in Thailand. Frisch's operates 31 Big Boy restaurants in the US, of which 13 are franchised. Big Boy Japan, also independent of Big Boy Restaurant Group, operates 274 restaurants in Japan.

The Big Boy name, concept, menu, and mascot were originally licensed to a wide number of regional franchise holders. Because many of the early franchisees were already in the restaurant business when joining the franchise, Big Boy was added to the franchisee name just as the Big Boy hamburger was added to its menu. In this sense, referring to a chain may be confusing, as each named franchisee was itself a chain and Big Boy could be considered a chain of chains.

People tend to be familiar with the particular franchise in their area rather than the restaurant in general, for example Bob's Big Boy in California, Shoney's Big Boy in the South or Frisch's Big Boy in much of Ohio, Marc's Big Boy in the Upper Midwest, Elias Brothers' Big Boy (or sometimes just Elias Brothers') in Michigan, among many others.

=== Franchising costs ===
Big Boy Restaurant Group and Frisch's Big Boy Restaurants both offer franchises in their exclusive territories, each having 20 year terms. As of 2023, Big Boy Restaurant Group charged a $50,000 franchise fee and an ongoing 4% royalty and up to 3% in advertising fees based on weekly gross revenue. In most of Michigan, the franchisee pays a 2% advertising fee and must spend an additional 1% on local advertising. Franchisees in the Upper Peninsula of Michigan or outside of the state pay a ½% advertising fee and must spend 1½% on local advertising. As of 2020, Frisch's Big Boy charges a $40,000–$45,000 franchise fee, and an ongoing 4% royalty and 2½% advertising fees on gross revenue. (Note: By comparison, in 2020, the former Big Boy master franchisee Shoney's Restaurants, charges a $35,000 franchise fee, a 4% royalty and 3¼% advertising fee.) The majority of Big Boy Restaurant Group units are franchised, while the majority of Frisch's units are company owned as of 2017. Big Boy Restaurant Group franchise agreements are not renewable but new agreements are required.

== History ==
Big Boy is an American casual dining restaurant chain headquartered in Southfield, Michigan; it is currently operated in most of the United States by Big Boy Restaurant Group, LLC.

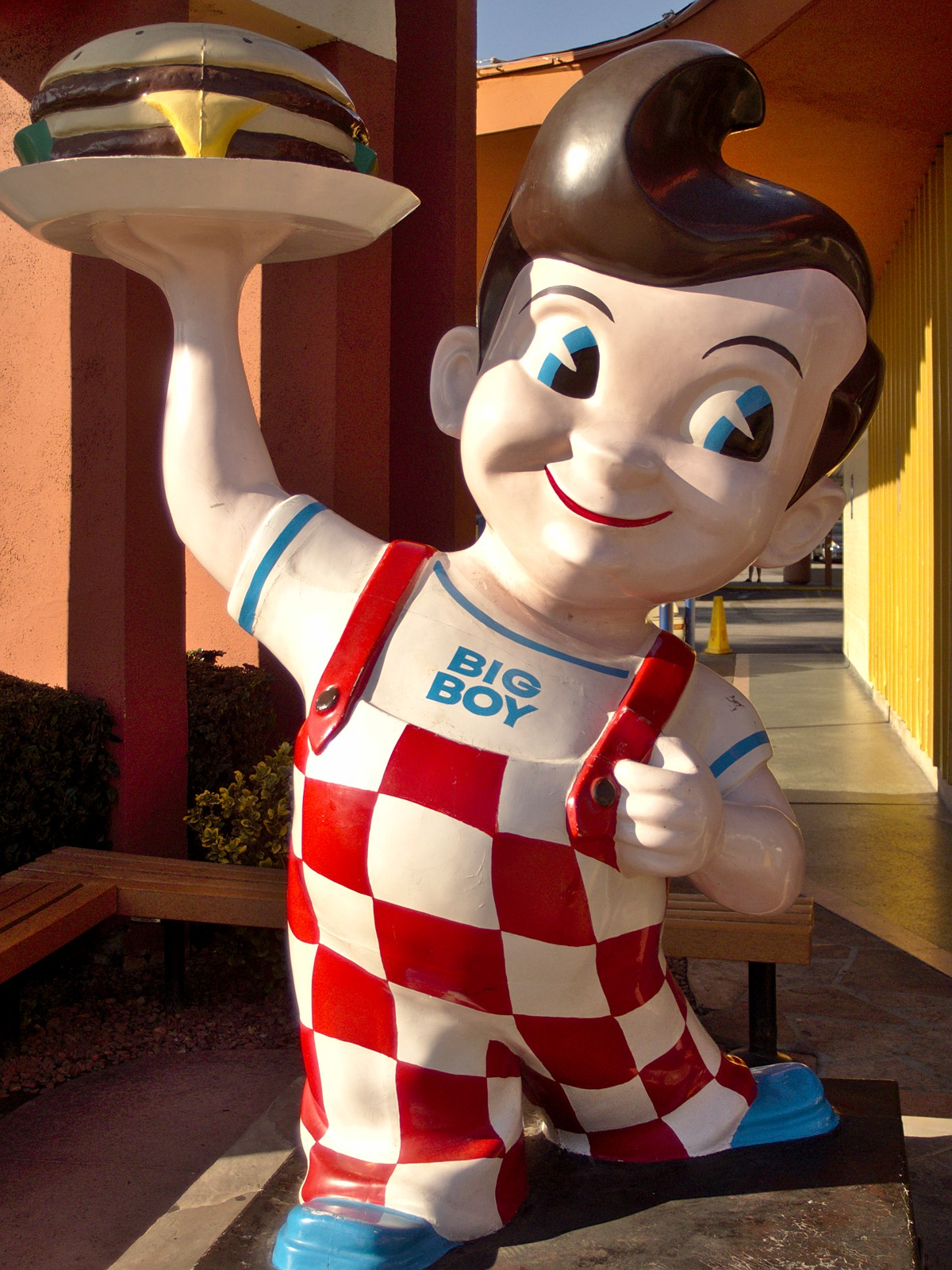
A Big Boy statue common to many restaurants in the chain

=== Creation by Bob Wian ===
Big Boy began as Bob's Pantry in 1936 by Bob Wian in Glendale, California. There, he assembled his special double-decker hamburger. Created as a joke for a customer wanting something different, the novel hamburger began drawing business. The name given to the popular sandwich provided a new name for his restaurant: Bob's Big Boy.

The restaurants became known as Bob's, Bob's Drive-Ins, (Note: In a 1947 training film, the office door is lettered Bob's Drive-In and although large mascots appear atop the building, nowhere is Bob's Big Boy mentioned.) Bob's, Home of the Big Boy Hamburger, and commonly as Bob's Big Boy. It became a local chain under that name. Nationally it was franchised by Robert C. Wian Enterprises; Wian only required franchisees to use Big Boy and not include Bob's.

In the late 1940s, Wian licensed two operators in the East to sell his Big Boy hamburger, Frisch's Big Boy in Cincinnati and Eat'n Park Big Boy in Pittsburgh; this served Wian's goal to procure and maintain a national trademark. In 1951, the third licensee Alex Schoenbaum of Shoney's Big Boy sold Wian on a formal franchising system, and with the popularity of the drive-in restaurant, a series of franchising and subfranchising Big Boys followed in the 1950s. The franchisees were required to sell the Big Boy hamburger and use their own name with Big Boy, not Bob's.

=== Marriott and Elias Brothers ownership ===
Marriott Corporation bought Big Boy in 1967. One of the larger franchise operators, Elias Brothers, purchased the chain from Marriott in 1987, moved the headquarters of the company to Warren, Michigan, and operated it until bankruptcy was declared in 2000.

=== Big Boy Restaurants International ===
During the bankruptcy, the chain was sold to investor Robert Liggett Jr., who took over as chairman, renamed the company Big Boy Restaurants International and maintained the headquarters in Warren. Immediately after Liggett's purchase, Big Boy Restaurants International – then known as Liggett Restaurant Enterprises – negotiated an agreement with the other large franchise operator, Frisch's Restaurants. The Big Boy trademarks in Kentucky, Indiana, and most of Ohio and Tennessee transferred to Frisch's ownership; all other Frisch's territories transferred to Liggett. (Note: As a franchisee, the Elias Brothers bankruptcy threatened Frisch's future use of the Big Boy trademark.) Thus Frisch's is no longer a franchisee; instead, Big Boy Restaurant Group and Frisch's are now independent co-registrants of the Big Boy name and trademark.

The previous Michigan-based owner of the Big Boy chain, which chiefly franchised previous Elias Brothers Big Boy restaurants in Michigan, has suffered a gradual loss of franchised restaurants. About 175 Big Boys existed in July 2006, compared to 76 in July 2019.

On April 16, 2017, the last Big Boy restaurant in the city of Detroit closed. The Big Boy in Fenton, Michigan, was expected to close in 2017. Both properties were sold to developers. Likewise, in 2016, the Jackson, Michigan, Big Boy closed after the site was purchased by a developer.

Other franchisees simply left the Big Boy chain. In April 2017, the Danville Big Boy, the only unit in Illinois, dropped Big Boy and rebranded as the Border Cafe. In 2016 both the Ann Arbor, Michigan, restaurant (on North Zeeb Road) and the restaurant in Houghton Lake, Michigan, continued to operate but not as Big Boy restaurants. The Tecumseh and Alma, Michigan restaurants announced they will allow their franchise agreements to expire on November 1, 2017, and early 2018, respectively, and both will continue to operate independently. The Marine City, Michigan, Big Boy closed in February 2018, to reopen independently by a new owner. However, in the same month, Big Boy added a new franchisee, an existing restaurant reopening as a Big Boy, in Woodhaven, Michigan. In April 2018, the Coldwater, Michigan location closed, media sources noting multiple health code violations and poor customer reviews.

Company-owned restaurants have also closed for under-performance.

=== Big Boy Restaurant Group ===
In 2018, Big Boy was sold to a group of Michigan investors and renamed Big Boy Restaurant Group, with David Crawford as chairman, CEO, and co-owner of the new company. In January 2020, Tamer Afr replaced Crawford as chairman, CEO, and co-owner. The company moved its headquarters from Warren to nearby Southfield in 2020.

In August 2020, a partnership was announced with Terrible Herbst to expand into Southern Nevada. On November 8, 2020, the first Big Boy restaurant opened in Indian Springs, Nevada. A second Big Boy opened in May 2022 in the Centennial Hills neighborhood of Las Vegas; called Big Boy Tavern, it includes a bar and small casino area. In June 2021, it was reported that a Big Boy restaurant will open on July 14, 2021, in Germantown, Wisconsin, a Milwaukee suburb. The franchisees will also operate two Big Boy food trucks and plan to open additional Big Boy restaurants in southeastern Wisconsin over a three-year period. The grand opening was pushed back to July 21 due to equipment shipping delays.

Big Boy Restaurants International tried a new fast casual concept known as Big Boy's Burgers and Shakes. The restaurant opened in 2016 in Mayfield Heights, Ohio, operated in strip mall instead of a larger traditional stand-alone building. The restaurant was closed by January 2020.

In November 2020, the Big Boy restaurant in Sandusky, Michigan, was stripped of its franchise when it refused to comply with Michigan's COVID-19 restrictions. Since then, it operates as Sandusky Family Diner.

In June 2023, Big Boy began to open restaurants with no table service and a fast-food menu and, harkening to their origin, called them Bob's Big Boy. The first two locations announced are in Michigan in the Detroit suburb of Farmington and Lansing.

On February 14th, 2025, the owners of Frisch's Big Boy, known as New Frisch's, sued Big Boy Restaurant Group for allegedly negotiating with NNN Reit to reopen formerly closed locations as Big Boys, which would violate the agreement settled with the parent organization in 2001. In March, Big Boy Restaurant Group started opening new restaurants in the evicted units, branded as Dolly's Burgers and Shakes, before swiftly closing them in October of the same year due to the lawsuit not going in their favor, as well as numerous food safety violations and poor performance.

==== Southeast Asia and Western Pacific locations ====
A franchise briefly operated at the beginning of the 21st century with three Big Boy restaurants in Bangkok and one in the southern beach town of Pattaya, but the business ultimately failed because the native Thai customers did not understand nor appreciate American-style food at that time. The restaurants adapted the menu to local tastes. Some Thai customers regarded the Big Boy statues as religious icons or had superstitions about them.

In 2019, Singapore-based Destination Eats signed a franchise agreement with the Big Boy Restaurant Group to initially open restaurants in Thailand, and later in Australia, China, Indonesia, Vietnam, Singapore, and the Philippines. In May 2020, the first Thai Big Boy restaurant opened in Bangkok, operated as a delivery-only service due to the COVID-19 pandemic. A second restaurant was opened in Pattaya in October 2020. The company is obligated to open 70 restaurants in its overall territory.

By May 2026, the franchise was reduced to one location in Bangkok that was first opened in 2022 at the MBK Center shopping center replacing the previous two locations that opened in 2020 during the COVID-19 pandemic. In addition to serving the classic Bigboy sandwich, french fries, and onion rings the new "flagship store" also offers Thai Rice Bowls to satisfy the tastes preferences of the local population.

== See also ==
- List of hamburger restaurants
- List of casual dining restaurant chains
- List of franchises
