= Frisch's =

American restaurant chain

Frisch's Big Boy
- Logo as of April 2025
- Formerly: Frisch's Restaurants, Inc. (1946–2024)
- Type: Private
- Traded as: AMEX American: FRS (1960–2015)
- Industry: Restaurant
- Founded: 1939; 87 years ago (as Mainliner Drive-In, Fairfax, Ohio)
- Founder: David Frisch
- Headquarters: Atlanta, Georgia, U.S.
- Number of locations: 31 (2025)
- Area served: Ohio, Kentucky, Indiana
- Key people: Cheryl White (CEO)Darren White (COO and President); Aziz Hashem (chairman)
- Products: Big Boy hamburger; Brawny Lad sandwich; Buddie Boy sandwich; Hot Fudge Cake; Swiss Miss sandwich
- Brands: Big Boy
- Owner: FBB IP LLC
- Website: www.frischs.com

Frisch's Big Boy is a regional Big Boy restaurant chain headquartered in Atlanta, Georgia. Founded in Cincinnati, Ohio, in 1939 by David Frisch, the chain became an early Bob Wian Big Boy licensee in the 1940s and in 2001 acquired perpetual rights to the Big Boy trademark in Indiana, Kentucky, most of Ohio, and parts of Tennessee independent of Big Boy Restaurant Group. As of March 2025, the chain operates 31 locations across Indiana, Kentucky, and Ohio.

Excluding the original Bob's Big Boy in California, Frisch's is the longest-operating regional Big Boy franchisee. Family ownership passed from founder David Frisch to his son-in-law Jack C. Maier and grandson Craig F. Maier until 2015, when the company was sold to Atlanta-based private equity fund NRD Capital. The same year, NRD entered a sale-leaseback agreement covering 74 of the chain's 121 owned locations; in 2024, Frisch's was unable to meet rising lease payments and was evicted from most of those stores, shrinking from 95 to 31 locations within four months. In November 2024, a group of senior managers acquired the remaining locations and branding rights from NRD.

== History ==
=== Origins and early restaurants ===
In 1905, Samuel Frisch opened the Frisch Cafe in Cincinnati, Ohio. Five years later he closed the café, moved to the Norwood suburb of Cincinnati, and opened another cafe. Success brought a new building in 1915 for the restaurant then known as Frisch's Stag Lunch. When the elder Frisch died in 1923, three of his sons, David, Reuben and Irving, continued operating the cafe; twenty-year-old Dave took his father's lead role.

In 1932, Dave Frisch sold his interest in Stag Lunch and opened his own Frisch's Cafe. Frisch's Cafe was a success and in 1938 a second location opened, this one across from the Stag Lunch in Norwood. Frisch could not meet the expenses of the Norwood restaurant; facing bankruptcy, both cafes closed in 1938. Fred Cornuelle, a local businessman, counseled Frisch and provided money for a new restaurant. In 1939 the Mainliner opened on Wooster Pike in Fairfax, Ohio. Cincinnati's first year-round drive-in restaurant, it was named after a passenger airplane that flew into nearby Lunken Airport. By 1944 a second Frisch's restaurant opened, designed to resemble George Washington's Mount Vernon home.

=== Big Boy affiliation ===
Immediately after World War II, Dave Frisch visited one of Bob Wian's Big Boy restaurants in California. Although he did not meet Wian on this trip, Frisch was struck by the double-deck Big Boy hamburger and saw advantages in cooking two thinner beef patties rather than a single thicker one.

Wian was concerned that drive-in operators outside California were using the Big Boy name and hamburger without permission. To maintain national trademark protection he needed authorized Big Boy restaurants in other regions, so when the two men later met Wian offered Frisch a low-fee licensing agreement of $1 per year for a four-state territory. The territory included the Cincinnati tri-state region of Ohio, Kentucky and Indiana and added Florida to increase Big Boy's national span. Frisch accepted and became the first Big Boy franchisee.

As the first franchisee, Frisch operated under an ad hoc arrangement that gave him unusual latitude. His double-deck Big Boy hamburger differed slightly from Wian's. Dave Frisch also created his own Big Boy character: a thinner boy with reddish or blond hair, wearing striped rather than checkered overalls, presented in a running or skipping pose. Known as the East Coast Big Boy, this mark represented Frisch's and its licensees Manners and Azar's through 1969. Most Frisch's Big Boy restaurants still display statues from this design, albeit usually repainted with brown hair and checkered overalls. In 2017 a redesigned statue resembling the West Coast Big Boy was introduced.

Dave Frisch began selling Big Boy hamburgers in 1946 at Frisch's Mainliner Drive-In. After signing a licensing agreement with Wian in 1947, the first Frisch's Big Boy Drive-In restaurant, Big Boy One, opened on Central Parkway north of downtown Cincinnati.

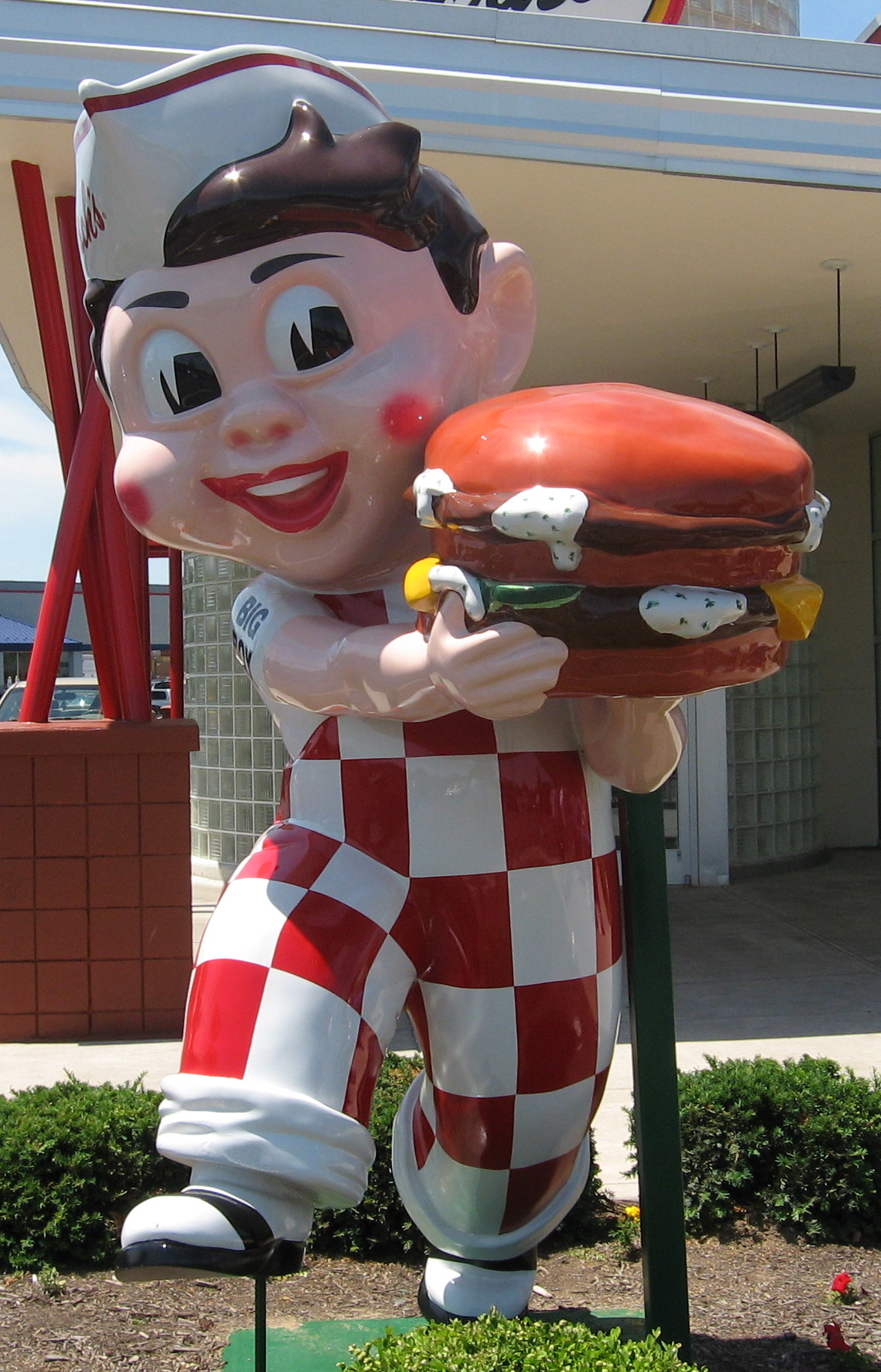
An "East Coast" Big Boy statue exclusive to many Frisch's restaurants.

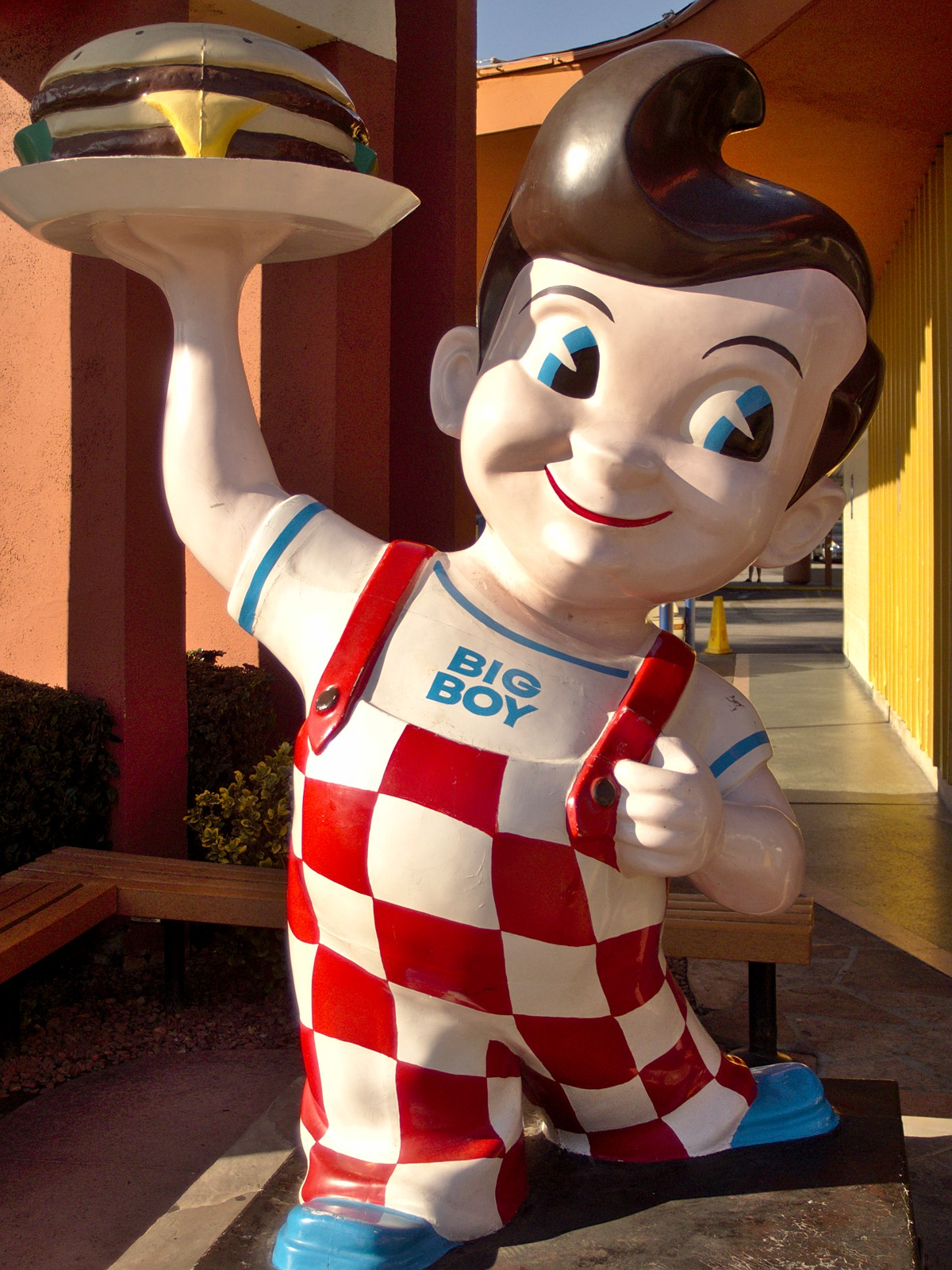
"West Coast" Big Boy statues are displayed at some Frisch's restaurants.

"East Coast" and "West Coast" Big Boy statues
A revamped statue with a West Coast style will gradually replace existing models.

=== Expansion and franchise territories (1949–1991) ===
David Frisch opened three more Big Boy Drive-In Restaurants in 1949 – including the first in Kentucky – and opened his fifth drive-in the following year. (Note: The Mainliner and Mt. Vernon restaurants – locations predating Big Boy – offered drive-in service but are not included in the number of drive-ins. This explains seeming inconsistencies of six locations in 1949 but five in 1950. From 1948 through the early 1960s the new units were primarily drive-in restaurants.) By 1954 Frisch's operated 20 units in Greater Cincinnati and was subfranchising Big Boys elsewhere. In 1953 and 1954 Frisch's subfranchised Azar's Big Boy in Ft. Wayne, Indiana, and Manners Big Boy in the Cleveland, Ohio TV market. In 1955, Frisch's subfranchised northwest Ohio to Toledo brothers Milton and David Bennett, to operate under the Frisch's Big Boy name. By the fall of 1961 upwards of 150 drive-ins were in service by Frisch's and its franchisees.

==== Louisville operations ====
Around 1956, Frisch's opened two locations in Louisville. None of these locations remain today. One was close to the Dixie Drive In (now a Mazda/VW dealership), the other in Saint Matthews (now a Mike's Car Wash). The next year, they opened one near Rubbertown, (now a mobile home park) and in 1958, one opened near Jeffersontown (now a family center). According to former marketing executive Karen Maier, Louisville-area Frisch's restaurants were franchised through the 1970s and operated by several different owners.

Frisch's also licensed or subfranchised Big Boy operations in several nearby markets through Manners (Cleveland), Azar's (Fort Wayne), the Bennett brothers (northwest Ohio) and Elby's (Ohio Valley). (Note: Locations included Morristown, Ohio (1960), St. Clairsville, Ohio (1966) and Steubenville, Ohio (1969).) Disputes with Elby's and Shoney's over territorial rights and non-Big Boy operations near Frisch's territory contributed to both chains leaving the Big Boy system in 1984 after extended litigation. Alex Schoenbaum, founder of Shoney's (originally the Parkette Drive-In), was a close friend of Dave Frisch; Frisch introduced Schoenbaum to Bob Wian and encouraged him to become the Big Boy franchisee for West Virginia. Eat'n Park in Pittsburgh, founded by Larry Hatch in 1949 after he observed Frisch's drive-in operation, was the second Big Boy franchisee and did not renew its franchise in 1975. Both Eat'n Park and Shoney's continue to operate independently.

Frisch's created the "Brawny Lad" and "Swiss Miss" chopped-sirloin sandwiches, served on rye buns and introduced in the 1950s and 1970 respectively; both were later added to many other Big Boy franchisee menus. Frisch's "Filet de Sole" fish sandwich and the use of the term "platter" rather than "combination plate" for entrée plates also spread within the Big Boy system.

Frisch's branded tartar sauce has been distributed to local grocery stores since 1960. The Silverton, Ohio–based Food Specialties Co. has produced the sauce for Frisch's since 1946 under what the company describes as a handshake agreement between its founder and David Frisch; Food Specialties owns the recipe but not the Frisch's brand name.

In 1963, McDonald's launched the Filet-O-Fish in Cincinnati in a marketing push that local press described as aimed at Frisch's.

=== Separation from Big Boy Restaurants (2000–2015) ===
In 2000, Frisch's had the opportunity to purchase the national Big Boy chain, which was in bankruptcy, but declined the offer. Instead Robert Liggett purchased the national chain. Early the following year, Liggett's operation, renamed Big Boy Restaurants International made a deal with Frisch's, paying $1.2 million for Frisch's territories in Florida, Georgia, Texas, Oklahoma and Kansas, and granting Frisch's perpetual ownership of the Big Boy mark in remaining territories. The bankruptcy threatened Frisch's right to operate and franchise Big Boy restaurants but was forever resolved by the separation. The separation also relieved tensions for Big Boy, who charged other franchisees royalties and licensing fees that Frisch's was exempt from. Frisch's franchise agreement with Bob Wian, which had no expiration, required a trivial $1 per year licensing fee.

Frisch's sold the former Kip's territory as well as Georgia and Florida to Big Boy Restaurants International in 2001. Frisch's also remodeled, demolished or rebuilt older units around this time.

In December 2013, Frisch's switched from Coca-Cola to Pepsi products, citing a better supplier deal. The change drew complaints from customers attached to the chain's "cherry" and "vanilla" Coke offerings. In 2018, Coca-Cola returned to Frisch's restaurants under chief executive Jason Vaughn; Cincinnati Reds catcher Tucker Barnhart poured the first Coca-Cola at the Mainliner location on July 27, 2018.

=== NRD Capital ownership (2015–2024) ===
Frisch's previously owned and operated numerous Golden Corral franchise restaurants in Indiana, Kentucky, Ohio, Pennsylvania, and West Virginia; after closing six under-performing stores in 2011, the company sold its remaining 29 Golden Corral units in March 2012.

On August 24, 2015, Frisch's was sold to an Atlanta-based private equity fund. The new owner, an affiliate of National Restaurant Development (NRD) Partners, (Note: National Restaurant Development NRD Holdings – founded by Aziz Hashim – are owners-operators of multi-unit franchised (primarily) fast food brands. NRD Partners, also known as NRD Capital – a subsidiary of NRD Holdings – is an equity fund of Hashim and other multi-unit food franchisees focusing on franchisors. The fund acts by either achieving a controlling interest in a franchisor or outright acquisition of a franchisor, applying NRD's expertise to improve both franchisees' and franchisor's function and value, and finally receiving return by selling individual NRD owned stores to motivated employees, selling NRD's interest outright or taking the brand public.) paid approximately $175 million to purchase outstanding shares of Frisch's stock. On September 4, 2015, Frisch's Restaurants, Inc. ceased to be a listed, publicly traded company. Aziz Hashim, CEO of NRD Partners, assumed Craig Maier's position as Frisch's president. In April 2016, Jason Vaughn was hired as CEO. (NRD had previously made a tentative bid in 2012 to acquire Frisch's remaining 29 Golden Corral units, before that sale was blocked by Golden Corral itself.)

The sale ended family ownership of the chain. Craig Maier, the chief executive, and his sister Karen Maier, vice-president of marketing—both grandchildren of founder David Frisch—retired from the company. However, both remain active as franchisees, operating individual Frisch's Big Boy Restaurants. (Note: In 2019, Craig Maier closed his franchised Frisch's Restaurant in the Mount Airy neighborhood of Cincinnati. (The unit is actually in Green Township.)) Other family members were either uninvolved in the business or too young, and none expressed interest in continuing the family's role at Frisch's.

NRD Partners planned to expand Frisch's presence in existing and smaller markets, including expanding statewide in Indiana, Kentucky, and Ohio outside of Greater Cleveland (which is served by Big Boy Restaurants International) while enjoying its Big Boy rights in Tennessee by expanding into that state, including Nashville.

In March 2017, Frisch's unveiled a redesigned statue resembling the original West Coast Big Boy with pompadour hair, striped overalls and modern footwear. The first new statue, in a Cincinnati Reds uniform, was placed at Great American Ball Park; a second was installed at the Dry Ridge, Kentucky, location, the chain's last newly built standalone restaurant.

Absent since closing its last downtown Cincinnati restaurant in 2004, Frisch's returned in June 2018, opening a Big Boy restaurant on the ground floor of the Carew Tower; it closed in 2020.

==== COVID-19 impact and closures ====
The COVID-19 pandemic prompted Frisch's to permanently close seven locations and to scale back operations at seven others. The closures included two restaurants in Louisville, the Carew Tower restaurant in Cincinnati, and several smaller Ohio locations; the scale-backs were all in Ohio. During the pandemic, Frisch's introduced "Big Boy's Market" sections selling essential grocery items at most of its locations.

Following the appointment of a new chief executive in 2022, Frisch's accelerated store closures in 2023, citing economic conditions and inflation. The company also began converting some corporate-owned locations to franchises. The planned Tennessee expansion did not occur.

Three further locations closed in April 2024, continuing a decline in the chain's footprint. Four days later, Frisch's closed its downtown Covington location.

On April 8, 2024, Aziz Hashem, managing partner of NRD Capital, attributed the closures to lease expirations and financial losses. He also confirmed a fifth location would close, which was in Beavercreek, Ohio.

==== 2024 evictions ====
By November 12, 2024, an additional 20 Frisch's locations across Ohio and Kentucky had been closed or were facing closure after the chain's landlord initiated eviction proceedings for non-payment of rent.

Real-estate analysts at the University of Cincinnati attributed part of the chain's distress to NRD's 2015 sale-leaseback of its real estate. Four months after acquiring Frisch's in 2015, NRD sold 74 of the chain's 121 owned stores for $74 million and leased them back; researchers said the resulting annual rent escalations made it difficult to absorb rising food, energy and labor costs.

On December 1, 2024, Cincinnati area news reported that five additional locations were facing eviction action with court hearings "later this month", including the first location to carry the name Frisch's, the Frisch's Mainliner, which opened in 1939 in Fairfax, Ohio.

By December 4, 2024, at least a dozen Frisch's Big Boy restaurants in Kentucky, including both locations in Lexington, had been ordered to close. According to a letter obtained by the Lexington Herald-Leader, Frisch's landlord, NNN Reit, had on November 25, 2024, ordered the Lexington stores—at 1849 Alysheba Way and 1927 Harrodsburg Road—to vacate the buildings. The Lawrenceburg, Indiana, location also received an eviction notice.

Court filings later put the total number of locations lost in the eviction wave at 64, reducing Frisch's footprint from about 95 restaurants to 31 within four months.

=== 2024 management acquisition and trademark dispute ===
On November 18, 2024, a group of senior managers led by Don Short and Cheryl White acquired several Frisch's locations and the Frisch's brand rights, including the right to use the Big Boy name. The new corporate structure retained NRD-era leadership including chief executive Darren White and chairman Aziz Hashem, with most restaurants operating as franchises. By 2025, the corporate office moved from Cincinnati to Atlanta, although it does not operate any locations in Georgia.

Following the restructuring, Frisch's became involved in a trademark dispute with Big Boy Restaurant Group over the use of the Big Boy name in former Frisch's locations. In February 2025, Frisch's alleged that Big Boy Restaurant Group's plans to reopen restaurants in its territory violated earlier trademark agreements. Big Boy Restaurant Group subsequently opened several former Frisch's sites under the Dolly's Burgers and Shakes name while the dispute proceeded. The Dolly's locations closed in October 2025, and Frisch's later sought confirmation of an arbitration award in its favor.

In early 2026, real-estate developer Lee Greer of Greer Properties acquired 11 former Frisch's locations from landlord NNN Reit for $20 million, with the possibility of reopening some sites as Frisch's restaurants.

Two locations were announced to open up in the summer of 2026. One was moved from an existing location on August 19th, and another opened up in Maysville, KY a week earlier., where the original location was previously evicted.

== Operations ==
=== Menu and signature items ===
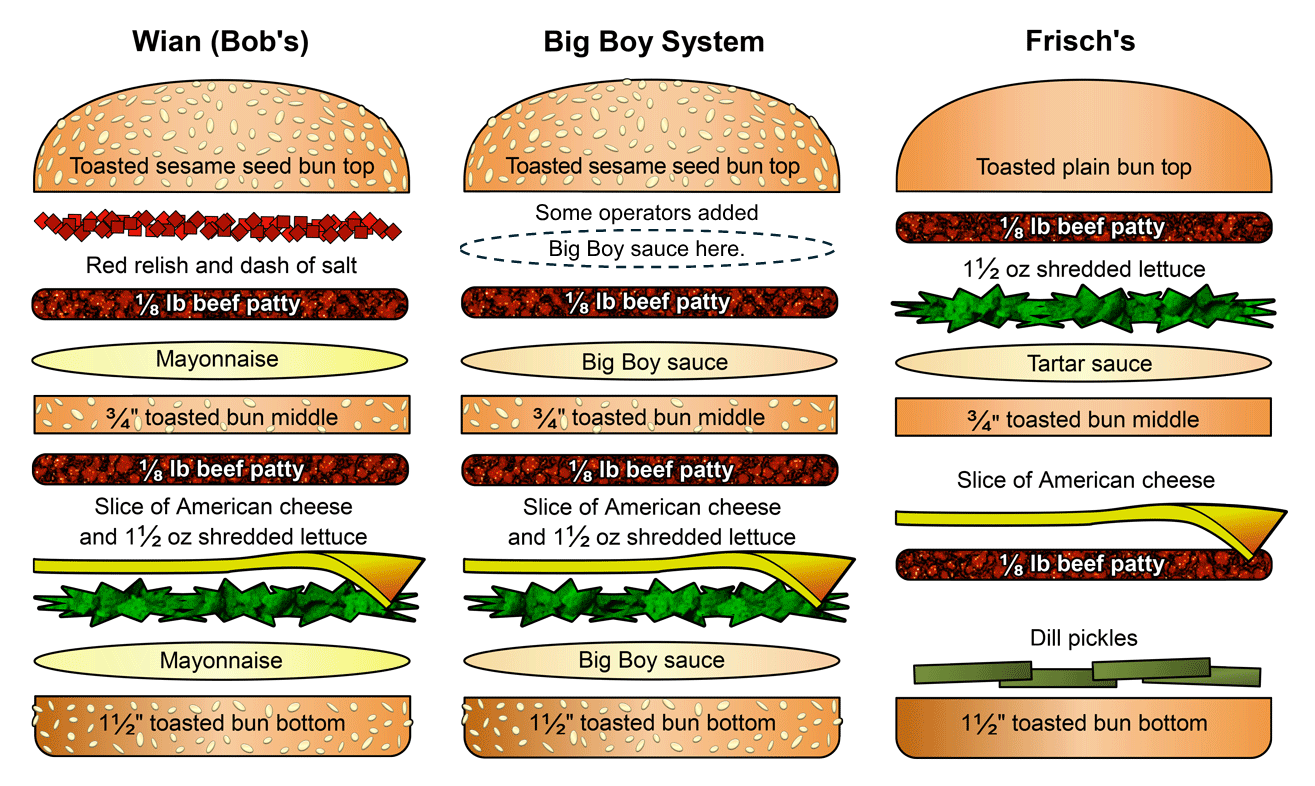
An illustration showing how Big Boy hamburgers are assembled. The original version developed by Bob Wian (left) has mayonnaise and red relish (a combination of pickle relish, ketchup and chili sauce). Frisch's version (right) replaces them with tartar sauce and dill pickles, and applies them in a different order. The worldwide Big Boy system version (center) instead uses a thousand island-type dressing advertised as "Big Boy special sauce".

The Frisch's Big Boy differs from versions at other Big Boy restaurants. Where Bob Wian's original used mayonnaise and red relish, Frisch substituted tartar sauce and dill pickles, applied in a different order. The wider Big Boy system later adopted a single combined dressing for the hamburger, known as thousand island dressing.

=== Branding and advertising ===
In earlier years, Frisch's adaptation of the Big Boy caricature was slimmer, had blond hair topped with a cook's cap and striped pants instead of the traditional checkered bib overall-type pants used by Bob's Big Boy. In the late 1960s both characters were redrawn incorporating common elements such as checkered pants and brown hair. This Frisch's Big Boy graphic was drawn with the pompadour and lost the cook's cap but otherwise the facial features remain the same as in the 1950s. This allowed Frisch's existing fiberglass statues to continue in use, with hair and overalls repainted. It is the typical statue displayed at Frisch's today, though several units use the West Coast Bob's Big Boy statue. In 2016 and 2017 a new design and statue were introduced, but only one was built. The one built was used at the Dry Ridge, Kentucky location, and when it closed, moved to the Louisville KY location.

During the 1970s, Frisch's used the slogan "Frisch's Has So Much More", which it also applied at its Kip's Big Boy chain in Texas, Oklahoma and Kansas.

In the mid-1980s, Marriott planned to retire the Big Boy character. As a publicity exercise, Marriott launched a "Should Big Boy Stay or Go?" campaign, asking customers at Frisch's and other Big Boy franchises to vote on whether the character should be retained. Customers overwhelmingly voted that Big Boy should stay.

Frisch's slogans have included "Frisch's Has So Much More" (1970s, also used by the broader Big Boy chain), "Frisch's starts with better stuff" (1990s), "What's Your Favorite Thing?" (1998–2016), and "Home of Burgers, Breakfast, & Big Boy." (2019–2023).

A Frisch's radio and television jingle from the 1960s ran:

Stop and enjoy a big Big Boy,
a double-deck hamburger treat,
A national favorite, coast to coast,
So stop and enjoy a big Big Boy.

=== Relationship with the Cincinnati Reds ===
Frisch's has had a long-running business relationship with the Cincinnati Reds. From 1983 to 1998, Frisch's was a part owner of the ball club as a silent partner to majority owner Marge Schott, including during the team's World Series win in 1990.

Two Frisch's Big Boy concession stands opened in 2013 at Cincinnati's Great American Ball Park. An East Coast Big Boy statue repainted in a Cincinnati Reds uniform was placed near one stand, and in March 2017, the first of the redesigned Frisch's statues, likewise in Reds uniform, was added.

== See also ==
- List of hamburger restaurants
- List of casual dining restaurant chains
- List of franchises
