= Eat'n Park =

United States restaurant chain

Eat'n Park Restaurants

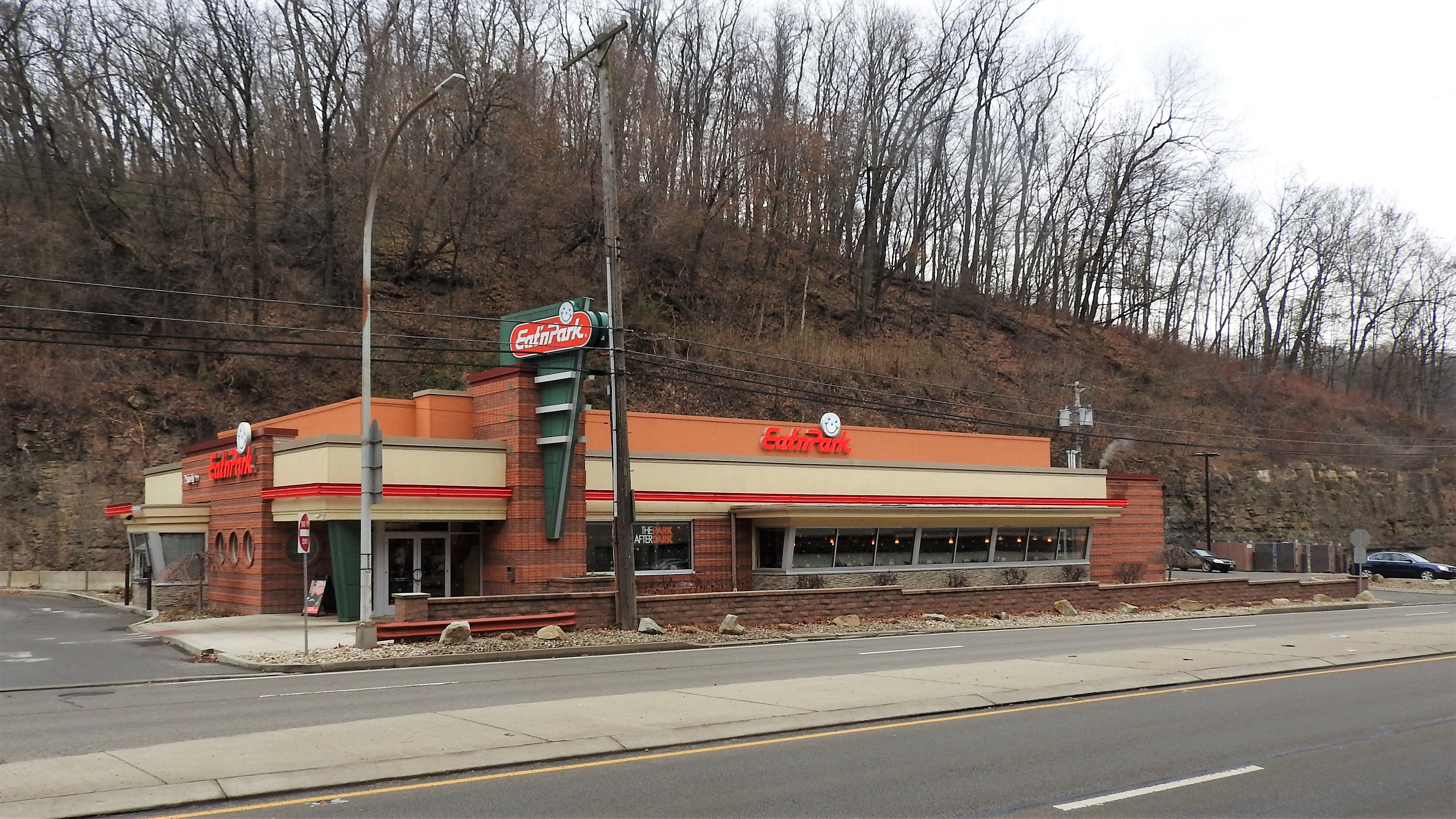
- A Eat'n Park restaurant in Pittsburgh
- Type: Private
- Industry: Restaurants
- Founded: June 6, 1949; 77 years ago in Pittsburgh, Pennsylvania, United States
- Founders: Larry Hatch; William D. Peters
- Headquarters: Homestead, Pennsylvania, United States
- Number of locations: 55
- Key people: Jeff Broadhurst (President); Mercy Senchur (Senior VP of Operations)
- Products: Breakfast foods, burgers, sandwiches, chicken, seafood, salads, appetizers, combos, kids' meals and desserts
- Number of employees: 10,000+ (2021)
- Parent: Eat'n Park Hospitality Group, Inc.
- Website: eatnpark.com

Eat'n Park Hospitality Group
- Type: Private
- Industry: Restaurants
- Founded: 2010; 16 years ago
- Headquarters: Homestead, Pennsylvania, U.S
- Key people: Jeff Broadhurst, (CEO); Mercy Senchur, (COO); Richard Liebscher (SVP)
- Revenue: ▲US$750 million (2021)
- Subsidiaries: Eat'n Park; Parkhurst Dining; Hello Bistro
- Website: enphospitality.com

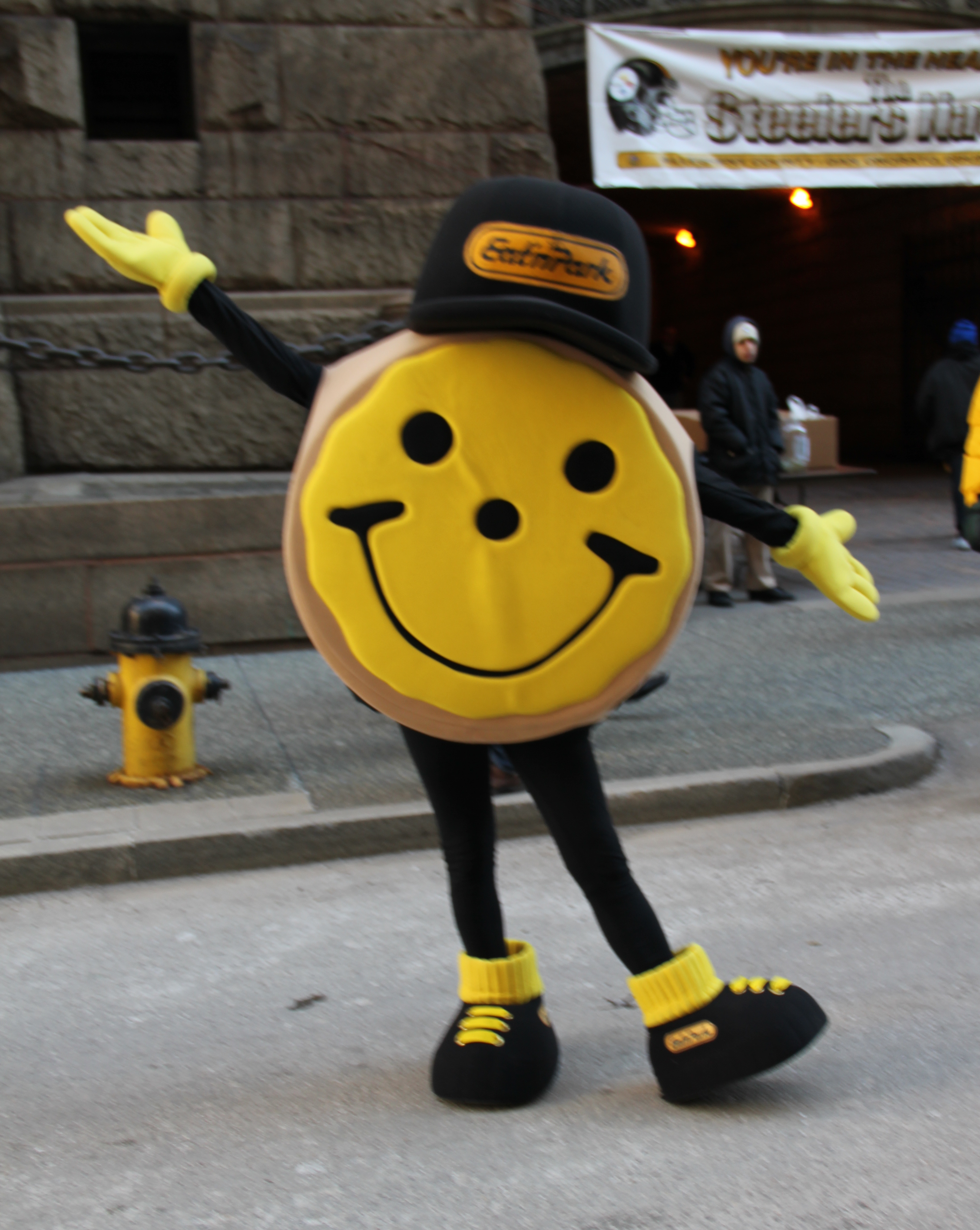
A black and gold Smiley Cookie appears at a rally for the Pittsburgh Steelers in 2011.

Eat'n Park is a restaurant chain based in Homestead, Pennsylvania. As of April 2024, the company operates 56 locations in Ohio, Pennsylvania, and West Virginia. The chain is known for its Smiley Cookies and has adopted the motto, "the place for smiles".

== History ==
Eat'n Park logos while the chain was affiliated with Big Boy Restaurants.

In the late 1940s, Larry Hatch and Bill Peters were supervisors at Isaly's Restaurants in Pittsburgh. On a trip to Cincinnati, Hatch was impressed seeing the Frisch's Big Boy Drive In operation. He and Peters contacted Big Boy founder Bob Wian, reaching a 25-year agreement to operate Big Boy Restaurants in the Pittsburgh area, which would be called Eat'n Park.

Eat'n Park launched on June 5, 1949, when Hatch and Peters opened a 13-stall drive-in restaurant on Saw Mill Run Boulevard in the Overbrook neighborhood of Pittsburgh. Advertised as "Pittsburgh's First Modern Eat-in-your-Car Food Service" this location was serviced by 10 carhops. Four months later, a second unit opened in Pittsburgh, by 1956: 11 units, 1960: 27 units, 1965: 30 units, and by 1973: 40 Eat'n Park locations. After leaving Big Boy, the chain entered Ohio and West Virginia, and eventually grew to over 75 restaurants. In 2017, there are 69 Eat'n Park restaurants operating.

Eat'n Park's early success had a direct impact on what would become the signature dish at McDonald's. Jim Delligatti, the Pittsburgh-area franchisee for McDonald's and one of Ray Kroc's earliest franchisees, invented what eventually became the Big Mac in the kitchen of Delligatti's first McDonald's franchise, located on McKnight Road in suburban Ross Township before debuting at the McDonald's owned by Delligatti in Uniontown, Pennsylvania, on April 22, 1967, selling for US$0.45 (equivalent to $4.35 in 2025). It was designed to compete with the Big Boy hamburger Eat'n Park was offering at the time.

In 1974, Eat'n Park allowed their 25-year Big Boy franchise agreement to expire. This was publicly attributed to discontinuation of car hop service—which ended in 1971—but it was largely motivated by the end of $1 per year licensing fee Eat'n Park enjoyed. As a result, the Big Boy hamburger was renamed the Superburger. The non-renewal of the Big Boy agreement eventually allowed Eat'n Park to expand into areas licensed to other Big Boy franchises. Eat'n Park expanded into Northeast Ohio including Greater Cleveland, Akron and Youngstown, and into West Virginia: first Morgantown, followed by Clarksburg and Wheeling. In 1977, Big Boy reassigned the Pittsburgh territory to Wheeling-based Elby's Big Boy. Sold to Elias Brothers Big Boy in 1986, the Elby's locations closed in 2000 when Elias Brothers faced bankruptcy, the rights now owned by Big Boy Restaurant Group. The closest Big Boy restaurants operate in Greater Cleveland and Frisch's Big Boy restaurants in Heath and Lancaster, both near Columbus. In Morgantown and Clarksburg, Eat'n Park competes with fellow former Big Boy franchisee Shoney's.

The company launched its signature Smiley Cookie in 1986 to coincide with adding a bakery to its locations. The Smiley Cookie came from Warner's Bakery, a small bakery in Titusville, Pennsylvania. The Smiley Cookie would become so popular that it would eventually be added to its logo and would spawn the "Frownie" brownie from rival Kings Family Restaurants, which would be controversially discontinued in 2015 after Kings was sold to a private equity firm. Eat'n Park filed several lawsuits against companies outside the restaurants' operating area to enforce its trademark on the Smiley Cookie.

In 2011, Eat'n Park was awarded the Achievement of Excellence award from the American Culinary Federation.

=== Locations ===
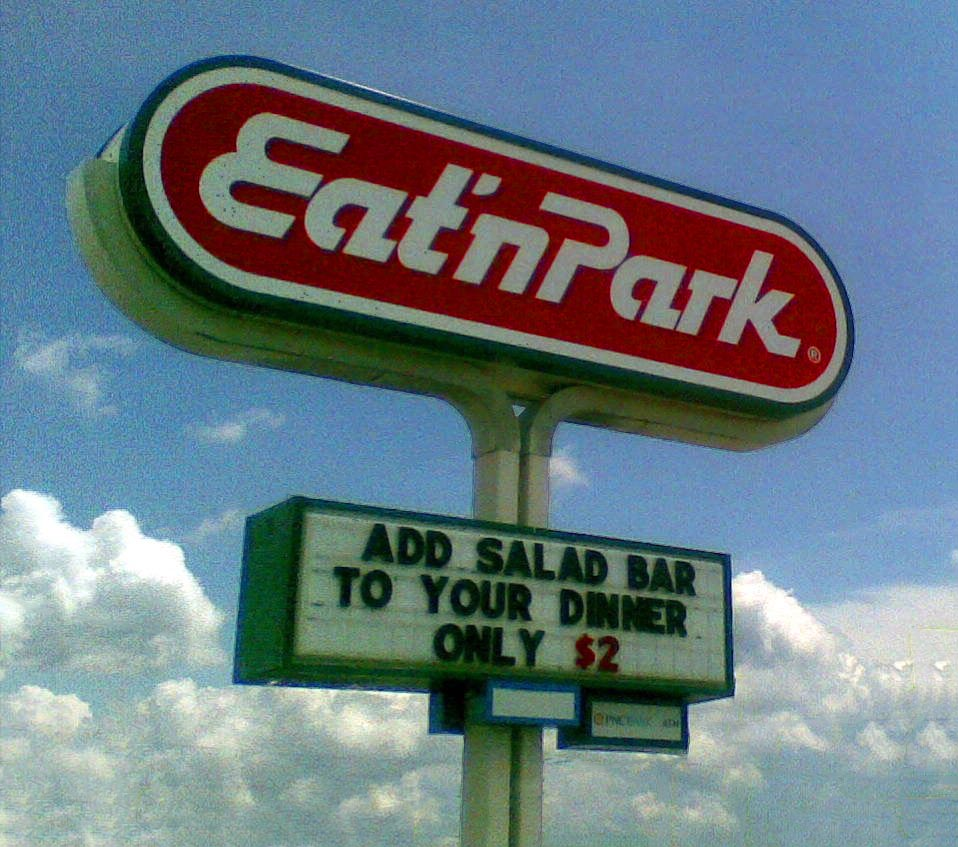
An Eat'n Park marquee pylon sign.

While Eat'n Park currently serves western Pennsylvania, eastern Ohio and northern West Virginia, the chain also served the Harrisburg, Lancaster, and York, Pennsylvania markets from the mid-1990s to 2010.

== Other concepts ==
In 2005, Eat'n Park opened Six Penn Kitchen, a restaurant inspired by chef-driven culture located in the cultural district of downtown Pittsburgh. The singular location was open for 13 years before closing on February 17, 2018.

Eat'n Park opened a new retro-themed dining experience, called The Park Classic Diner in 1999. Both the interior of the restaurant and the construction of the building was intended to mimic a 1950s diner. The concept closed in 2009 after only opening three restaurants with this concept.

The company's most successful concept is Hello Bistro, a fast casual chain focused on millennials offering gourmet burgers and salads while keeping its parent company ties to a minimum by offering prepackaged Smiley Cookies and the same brand of ranch dressing as the main Eat'n Park chain, but otherwise making no references to Eat'n Park. With six locations, Eat'n Park plans to expand the Hello Bistro concept throughout the Pittsburgh metropolitan area and potentially into new markets.

In 2011, Eat 'n Park launched The Porch, a new dining concept located in Schenley Plaza in Pittsburgh. The Porch aims to be a more upscale experience in both menu and atmosphere, with an emphasis on locally sourced and farm-to-table ingredients. Unlike the parent restaurants, The Porch offers a full bar menu including beer, wine and spirits. It utilizes a hybrid service model in which customers place their orders with the cashier during lunch hours, transitioning to full service for dinner. In 2017, a second location opened in the Pittsburgh suburb of Upper St. Clair.

== Christmas commercial ==
A Christmas tradition in the Pittsburgh region is the annual airing of an animated Eat'n Park commercial that shows a Christmas star (named Sparkle) struggling to reach the top of a Christmas tree. Released in 1982, in support of a charity at Children's Hospital of Pittsburgh, the commercial became so popular that Eat'n Park has re-aired the ad every year since, starting in late November. Believed to be the longest-running Christmas commercial in the United States, Eat'n Park now sells merchandise during the holiday season based on the ad. Sparkle, the Eat'n Park Star was trademarked by Eat'n Park in 1990 but was abandoned two years later.

== Lawsuit ==
In 2024, Eat'n Park sent a cease and desist letter to McArthur’s Bakery and The Pioneer Cafe in St. Louis. The bakery, which serves as a training facility for disabled adults, was accused of infringing on Eat'n Park's Smiley Cookies.
