= Shoney's =

Casual dining restaurant in the southeast USA

Shoney's North America, LLC
- Trade name: Shoney's
- Type: Private
- Industry: Restaurant
- Genre: Family dining
- Founded: 1947; 79 years ago in Charleston, West Virginia, United States (Parkette); 1959; 67 years ago in Madison, Tennessee, United States (Danner Foods)
- Founders: Alex Schoenbaum; Raymond L. Danner, Sr.
- Headquarters: Nashville, Tennessee
- Key people: David Davoudpour, CEO
- Products: Breakfast foods, Appetizers, Burgers, Sandwiches, Chicken, Seafood, Pulled Pork, and Desserts
- Revenue: ▲US$388.16 million (2019)
- Owner: David Davoudpour
- Number of employees: 2,500 (2019)
- Website: www.shoneys.com

Shoney's is an American restaurant chain headquartered in Nashville, Tennessee. As of October 2026, the company operates 45 locations in Alabama, Georgia, Kentucky, Louisiana, Missouri, North Carolina, Oklahoma, South Carolina, Tennessee, Virginia, and West Virginia.

Founder Alex Schoenbaum opened the first Parkette Drive-In in 1947, and became a licensee of Big Boy Restaurants in 1952. Two years later the name was changed to Shoney's, and aggressive subfranchising followed. Thirty years later, having outgrown its Big Boy territory, Shoney's dropped the Big Boy affiliation.

== History ==
=== 1947–1958: Early years as Big Boy franchisee ===
In 1947, Alex Schoenbaum opened the Parkette Drive-In next to his father's bowling alley in Charleston, West Virginia. After meeting with Big Boy founder Bob Wian in 1951, Schoenbaum became a Big Boy franchisee on February 7, 1952, now calling his several locations the Parkette Big Boy Shoppes. In May 1954, a public "Name the Parkette Big Boy Contest" was announced, and in June 1954 Schoenbaum's five Parkette Drive-Ins were rebranded as Shoney's.

Shoney's (the Parkette) was originally the Big Boy franchisee for West Virginia; however, Schoenbaum rapidly grew the chain through subfranchising, expanding his Big Boy territory through the southeastern United States, excluding Florida where the rights already belonged to fellow Big Boy franchisee Frisch's.

Schoenbaum's earliest subfranchisees operated under their own names. In 1955, Leonard Goldstein became a subfranchisee in Roanoke, Virginia. Originally operating as Shoney's, he eventually changed to Lendy's Big Boy after another Shoney's subfranchisee called Yoda's Big Boy opened across town. In 1956 a subfranchise was sold to the Boury brothers in northern West Virginia, who operated as Elby's. Elby's, Lendy's, and Yoda's units were originally listed with Shoney's units on the back of the Shoney's menu. Also in 1956, Schoenbaum sold a subfranchise to Abe Becker in Rochester, New York, for Becker's Big Boy. Two Philadelphia area subfranchises, Tunes and Arnold's, were opened during this period as well. In 1959, subfranchisee Abe Adler opened Adler's Big Boy in Lynchburg, Virginia, which was later sold to Lendy's. Also in 1959, Shap's Big Boy was subfranchised in Chattanooga, Tennessee, later assuming the Shoney's name. After this, all subfranchises went by the name Shoney's.

A Shoney's franchisee purchased the parent company in 1971. Under his leadership Shoney's doubled in size every four years, eventually operating or licensing over one third of the Big Boy restaurants nationwide.

=== 1959–1975: Expansion of Shoney's and going public ===
Selling vending machines in the late 1950s, Ray Danner noticed the popularity of Frisch's Big Boy and other drive–in restaurants. Danner, who had operated small businesses, wanted a single Big Boy in his hometown of Louisville, Kentucky. Because Frisch's had a Louisville franchisee, he and business partner James Craft contacted Alex Schoenbaum and bought the Shoney's Nashville franchise for $1000. In 1959, the pair opened their first Shoney's Big Boy in Madison, a Nashville suburb, built four more by 1961, and a total of seven Shoney's Big Boys when Danner bought Craft's interest. Then known as Shoney's Big Boy of Middle Tennessee, by 1966 the company operated 10 Big Boys. That year Danner acquired the Louisville Kentucky Fried Chicken franchise, which would grow to 22 stores over 15 years.

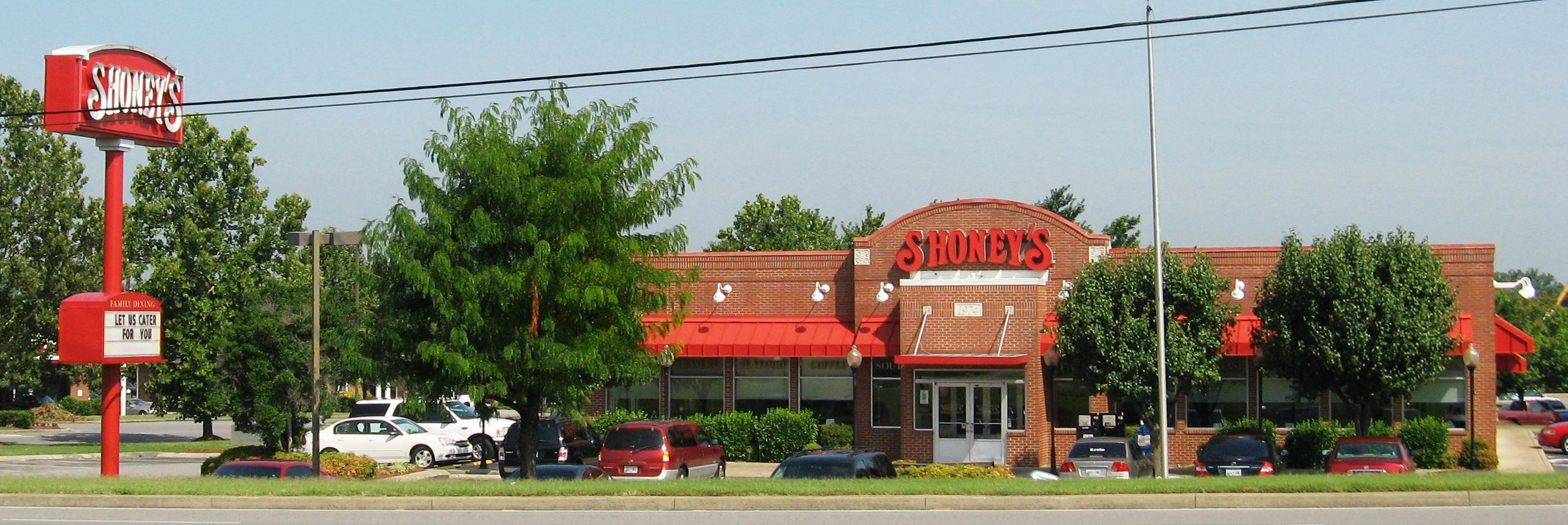
Shoney's in Hendersonville, Tennessee.

In 1969, Shoney's Big Boy of Middle Tennessee and the KFC subsidiary became a public company and was renamed Danner Foods, Inc., with Danner as president. The company now included 14 Big Boy restaurants, and by 1970, added one Big Boy in Columbus, Georgia and another in Opelika, Alabama. Danner wanted additional Shoney's territory but Schoenbaum was developing those areas himself, so the company opened a similar "Danner's Family Restaurant" in Louisville, the first of several.

Danner Foods opened a fast-food seafood and hamburger concept, Mr. D's Seafood and Hamburgers. Launched on August 15, 1969, 9 stores would open by January 1971, growing to 32 stores by 1975, when Danner's namesake Mr. D's would remove hamburgers from the menu, focusing on seafood entirely and being renamed Captain D's, along with franchises being offered. By 1977, over 140 restaurants had opened and "Hamburger" was dropped from the "Captain D's Seafood" name. The number of Captain D's restaurants would quadruple over the following decade. Danner Foods also opened Mr. D's Islander Restaurant in Huntsville, Alabama, which offered gourmet dining including seafood, steaks and Cantonese cuisine.

By 1971, Danner's company had become the second largest Shoney's franchisee by number of units. That year, Danner Foods bought the Shoney's trademark and assets from Alex Schoenbaum, Danner becoming president and CEO, moving the headquarters and commissary from Charleston to Nashville; Danner also changed the legal name of the companies from Shoney's Big Boy Franchising Companies, Inc., Parkette Commissary, Inc. and his Danner Foods, Inc. to Shoney's Big Boy Enterprises, Inc.. Schoenbaum became Chairman of the board of directors. As director of a public company, he was forced to close his personally owned Shoney's #1, the original Parkette Drive–in, by 1975.

=== 1976–2006: Leaving Big Boy and bankruptcy ===
In 1976, five years after being renamed Shoney's Big Boy Enterprises, Inc., stockholders approved changing the company name to Shoney's, Inc. Shoney's said this reflected the company's diverse food service brands, but added, "Shoney's is much more than the southern reincarnation of Frisch's Big Boy." However, as Schoenbaum's wife Betty said, the change would permit Shoney's to continue expansion beyond the boundary of its Big Boy territory.

In 1978, the several Danner's Family Restaurants in Louisville, were renamed Danner's Towne and Country using logos increasingly similar to Shoney's. In 1982, the company opened two Towne and Country restaurants in Tallahassee, Florida, also Frisch's Big Boy territory, but these were co–branded as Shoney's Towne and Country. This caused Frisch's to sue for unfair competition, claiming a strong association of both the "Shoney's" name and "Towne and Country" concept with "Big Boy". Frisch's had already filed similar civil actions against the Wheeling, West Virginia–based Elby's Big Boy franchise, which in 1971, broke ties with Frisch's and operated non–Big Boy Elby's restaurants in Ohio. In March 1984, a Federal district court denied Frisch's request for a temporary injunction blocking Shoney's building additional units in Kentucky and Florida. (Frisch's appealed, but in April 1985, a Federal appeals court affirmed the ruling.)

After Big Boy was removed from the company name in 1976, the Big Boy was becoming less and less prominent at Shoney's, disappearing completely from the company's 1983 annual report. Once called "a meal in one on a double–deck bun", a company official now called the Big Boy hamburger, "a Depression burger, a lot of bread and no meat". Following the March 1984 federal court ruling favoring Shoney's, Marriott Corporation, then owner of the Big Boy trademark, negotiated a settlement that would allow Shoney's to buy out its Big Boy franchise agreement. And in April 1984, Shoney's withdrew from the Big Boy system, paying Marriott $13 million (equivalent to $40.3 million in 2025). (In August 1984, Elby's likewise dropped its remaining Big Boy affiliation in West Virginia and Pennsylvania.) At the time Shoney's was the largest Big Boy franchise, with 392 Shoney's Big Boy Restaurants, representing more than a third of the national Big Boy chain. Like the former Big Boy stores, the Towne and Country units were renamed simply Shoney's. Additional Shoney's restaurants opened in Frisch's Big Boy territory, three in the Cincinnati area, with plans to open three more annually until the market was saturated.

=== Racial discrimination ===
In April 1989, a class action lawsuit was filed in Pensacola, Florida, charging Shoney's with widespread racial discrimination in which African American applicants were denied employment, and African American employees were denied promotion, harassed or terminated without cause, based on race, and that white managers were harassed or terminated for objecting to the practices. The case, joined by the NAACP Legal Defense and Education Fund, was filed by nine named plaintiffs: five black employees and four white managers.

The lawsuit claimed that racial policies were systemic, involving upper management including chairman Ray Danner, who was named individually as a co-defendant. On restaurant visits, Danner would allegedly tell managers to "lighten the place up" if he felt too many blacks were employed at the location, as "the number of blacks [needed] to coincide with [the] neighborhood ethnic group". Restaurant managers testified that Danner didn't want black people seen by customers, because no one wanted to eat at a restaurant where "a bunch of niggers" were working. (Danner responded that he could not remember making such statements, and denied use of the racial epithet or having such racial policies.) Managers also testified that company officials instructed them to "blacken the 'o' " in the Shoney's logo (or the "A" in Application) on job applications of African Americans.

In 1993, the court approved an award of $105 million ($132.5 million including costs and fees), the largest discrimination settlement at the time. Danner, who in the interim became a life member of the NAACP, surrendered shares of company stock worth $65 million toward the settlement, and resigned from Shoney's board of directors. The court also ordered a detailed company-wide affirmative action program, including training and educational programs.

Among an estimated 40,000 persons in the class, compensation was awarded to every African American person employed at Shoney's company-owned restaurants between February 4, 1985, and November 3, 1992. Eleven persons received the maximum $100,000 (equivalent to $223,000 in 2025). The suit included company-owned food service operations such as Shoney's, Captain D's and Lee's Famous Recipe, but excluded franchised restaurants.

At its peak in 1998, the restaurant chain operated or franchised over 1,800 restaurants in 34 states. None of those businesses remains a part of the Shoney's restaurant enterprise today. In 2000, the company filed for Chapter 11 bankruptcy protection and was acquired by Texas-based investment group Lone Star Funds two years later.

=== 2007 to present: new ownership and rebranding ===
On January 1, 2007, Lone Star announced that the Shoney's chain—at this point down to 272 restaurants—was being sold to David Davoudpour, founder and CEO of the Atlanta-based Royal Capital Corporation, the largest franchisee of Church's Chicken restaurants. At the time of purchase, there were 61 corporate owned stores. Davoudpour began purchasing franchisee locations and rebranding the restaurants, including offering new menu items and upgrades to individual locations.

In January 2014, Shoney's opened a location in Sugarloaf Mills in Lawrenceville, Georgia. The restaurant served as a prototype for the company brand, offering alcohol service and being the company's first mall-based location. At the time of the opening, Shoney's operated 165 restaurants in 16 states. In 2017, the chain began modernizing locations with a contemporary look. As of 2019, Shoney's operates locations in 17 states. It also had "Shoney's On The Go" for takeout orders which is used in smaller locations such as malls and airports.

== Menu ==
Shoney's is a family casual restaurant, offering traditional American-style food such as hamburgers, chicken, steaks, fish, sandwiches, salads and desserts. Some of its iconic menu items include the All American Burger, Slim Jim Sandwich, hot fudge cake and strawberry pie. Shoney's also became known for its breakfast bar beginning in the 1980s. It offers full-menu dining service with some locations having buffets and alcohol service.

== Shoney's Inn ==
In 1975, the restaurant chain founded Shoney's Inn, a motel chain. After the motels were sold off in 1991, Shoney's continued to collect royalties on the name. Between 2002 and 2006, the last remaining Shoney's Inns were re-branded as GuestHouse.

== In popular culture ==
- In Frank Ocean's song Nights mentions Shoney's in the line "When we could only eat at Shoney's on occasion"
- In Rick and Morty, Shoney’s appears in several episodes. It’s the setting for scenes in The Rickshank Rickdemption and Star Mort Rickturn of the Jerri, is mentioned in Night Family and Pickle Rick, and also makes a visual appearance in The Ricklantis Mixup.
- In King of the Hill, Shoney’s is mentioned in Mutual of Omabwah where Peggy Hill talks about getting lunch there after shopping.

== See also ==
- List of hamburger restaurants
- List of casual dining restaurant chains
- List of franchises
- List of fun runs
