= Bob Bindig =

American cartoonist

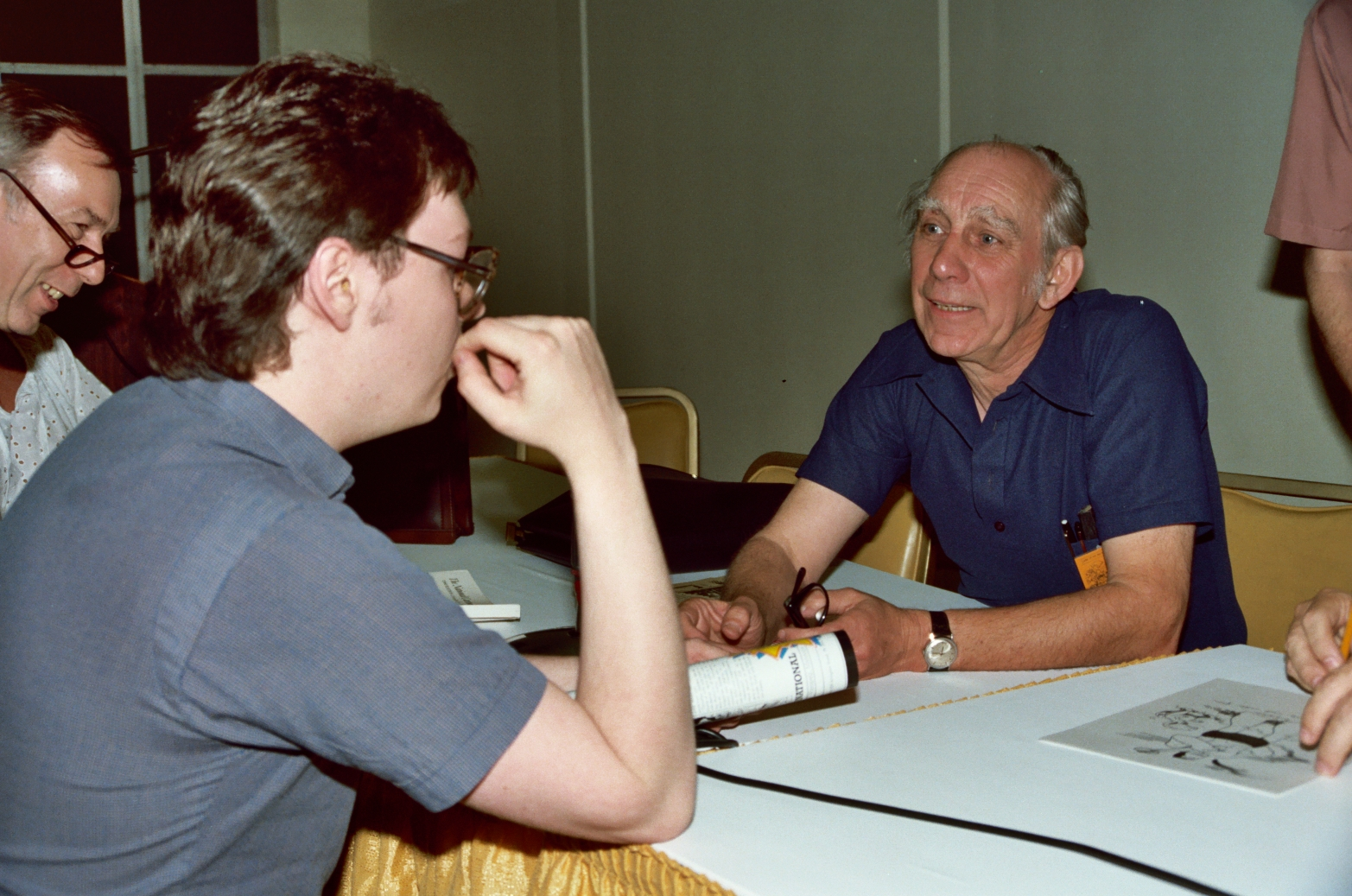
Bob Bindig (right) in 1982.

Robert K. Bindig (December 21, 1920 – November 6, 2007) was a cartoonist and comics historian who worked on the Adventures of the Big Boy comic book from 1985 to 1995.

== Education ==
In the late 1930s, Bindig attended the Buffalo Technical High School where he took a number of art classes.

== Personal life ==
Bindig was born in Buffalo, New York, but eventually moved to Orchard Park. He married Doris Krull in 1941, with whom he had five children, five grandchildren, and one great-grandchild. As a hobby, he collected comic pages, of who he described as the "real greats". While deployed with the US Army, he sent letters to his wife, with colourful drawings on the envelopes that portrayed what he was doing or thinking.

== Career ==
After high school, Bindig went to work for a local newspaper's art department in 1939. In 1943, while Bindig was creating test drawings to apply for a job at Walt Disney, he was drafted into the US Army. He joined the Medical Corps, and became the head of the art department, where he was assigned to illustrate military manuals and publications. In 1945, he was sent to the Philippines to illustrate propaganda leaflets. After WW2, he was placed in Korea. During his time there, he created a wordless comic strip titled "The Mischievous Twin Bears" for a local Korean newspaper.

After returning to the US, Bindig became an advertising artist, where he worked for firms such as Fisher-Price, Rich Products Corporation, and National Gypsum for ten years before choosing to become a freelancer. He also created the character of Buster Bison as the mascot for the AAA Buffalo Bisons baseball team. Bindig retired from his career in advertising in 1986. After his retirement, he took over "Adventures of the Big Boy". He drew for the series from 1985 to 1995, then retired a final time.

Along with being an advertising art director, Bindig was also a comics historian who assisted the Dutch comic book store and art gallery Lambiek with numerous exhibitions.

In 2000, the Library of Congress selected some of Bindig's work for the "Art of War" website, part of the Veterans History Project.

== Awards ==
He received the National Cartoonist Society Advertising Illustration Award in 1988, and the San Diego Comic-Con Inkpot Award in 1982.

== Death ==
Bindig died of unknown causes in the Sisters of Charity Hospital in Buffalo, on Wednesday, November 2007. He was 86. He was survived by his wife of 65 years, three sons, David, Terry and Mark; and two daughters, Wendy and Amy. His memorial service was held at 11 AM, in Orchard Park Presbyterian Church.
