= Rudolf Bindig =

German politician (born 1940)

Rudolf Bindig (born 6 September 1940 in Goslar, Lower Saxony) is a German politician who was elected eight times from 1976 to 2005 as a member of the Bundestag for the Social Democratic Party of Germany (SPD). From 1996 to 2005 he was also a member (and from 1988 to 1996 an alternate member) of the Parliamentary Assembly of the Council of Europe, of which he was elected a vice-president in 2002.
