= Alex Schoenbaum =

American businessman

Alexander Z. Schoenbaum
- Schoenbaum framed by a Big Boy statue
- Born: August 8, 1915; Petersburg, Virginia, U.S.
- Died: December 6, 1996 (aged 81); Sarasota, Florida, U.S.
- Monuments: Schoenbaum Hall (Ohio State), Schoenbaum Library (University of Charleston), Schoenbaum Family Enrichment Center (Charleston, WV)
- Education: Ohio State University
- Occupations: Restaurateur, entrepreneur
- Known for: Shoney's Restaurants
- Spouse: Betty Schoenbaum (m. 1940; died 2018)
- Parents: Emil B. Schoenbaum (father); Goldie R. Schoenbaum (mother)

Alex Schoenbaum (August 8, 1915 – December 6, 1996) was an American collegiate football player and businessman in the hospitality industry, eventually operating a chain of restaurants and later, motels and religious leader. He is best remembered for developing the Shoney's restaurant chain in the southeastern United States, most of which were originally franchised Big Boy locations.

== Childhood and college football career ==
Schoenbaum was born in Petersburg, Virginia to Jewish immigrants Emil B. (1884 - 1962) who was born in Poland, and Goldie R. (1879 - 1951) (née Masinter), who was born in Lithuania. Alex grew up in West Virginia with three brothers, and worked in his father's bowling establishments in Charleston and Huntington.

He played tackle at Ohio State University from 1936 to 1938. He received an honorable mention as AP All-Western Conference in 1936 and as Grantland Rice All-America honorable mention and AP All-Western Conference second team in 1937 and 1938. He was a seventh round selection (55th overall pick) of the Brooklyn Dodgers in the 1939 NFL draft.

== Hospitality industry ==
Following his sporting career, Schoenbaum went on to found the Shoney's restaurant chain, a regional organization which is one of the largest businesses to have originated in West Virginia and was at one time one of the largest family owned restaurant chains in the United States. In 1947 Schoenbaum opened his first drive-in restaurant, Parkette, in Charleston. In 1952, Schoenbaum obtained the regional marketing rights to the Big Boy trademark, two years later Parkette being renamed Shoney's. Besides being an operator, Schoenbaum also aggressively subfranchised to others, many as Shoney's and some in the 1950s using their own name. In 1971, Nashville–based Shoney's operator Raymond L. Danner acquired Shoenbaum's company to form Shoney's Big Boy Enterprises, Inc., a publicly held company. With Danner as president and CEO, Schoenbaum became chairman of the board of directors. When Shoney's original franchise agreement with Big Boy expired in 1976, Big Boy Enterprises was dropped from the name. In 1982, Shoney's opened two non–Big Boy restaurants (called Shoney's Towne and Country) in Tallahassee, Florida, Big Boy territory assigned to Frisch's Restaurants, causing Frisch's to sue for unfair competition. In 1984, Shoney's–now the largest regional franchisee–left the Big Boy system removing over a third of the American units. Shoney's prevailed in the Frisch's lawsuit, the final appeal adjudicated after separation from Big Boy.

With Schoenbaum as chairman, the Shoney's organization also developed and operated the Captain D's fast food seafood chain, Lee's Famous Recipe Chicken fast-food chain, now part of Mrs. Winner's and three casual dining chains, The Sailmaker, Pargo's, and the Fifth Quarter Steakhouses. In 1976, the company started a lodging chain, with properties branded as "Shoney's Inn" motels. By the 1990s, the company operated over 1,000 restaurants.

== Legacy ==
Alex Schoenbaum died on December 6, 1996, almost 50 years after he began what became his hospitality empire. He was survived by wife Betty Schoenbaum (née Frank), (who became active in civic matters and philanthropy in West Virginia, and her winter hometown of Sarasota, Florida) and their four children Joann, Jeff, Emily, and Raymond. They had seven grandchildren, and ten great-grandchildren. Betty died on July 31, 2018, at the age of 100.

In Charleston, West Virginia, where the business began, the Schoenbaum Family Enrichment Center and the Schoenbaum Soccer Stadium were family contributions to the community. In addition, at the Max M. Fisher College of Business in Columbus, the undergraduate business program is housed in Schoenbaum Hall named in his memory.

In 2018, the Alex Schoenbaum scholarship and the Alex Schoenbaum Jewish Scholarship Fund was established through the Jewish Federation of Greater New Orleans and Alex's daughter, Emily to bolster African American–Jewish relations in New Orleans.
