= NNN Reit =

(ticker symbol: NNN) a real estate investment trust in the US

NNN REIT, Inc.
- Formerly: Golden Corral Realty Corp. (1984-1993) Commercial Net Lease Realty (1993-2006) National Retail Properties, Inc. (2006-2023)
- Type: Public company
- Traded as: NYSE: NNN; S&P 400 component
- Industry: Real estate investment trust
- Founded: October 1984; 42 years ago (as Golden Corral Realty Corp.)
- Headquarters: Orlando, Florida, U.S.
- Key people: Stephen A. Horn, Jr. (CEO & President); Edward J. Fritsch (Chairman); Vincent H. Chao (CFO)
- Products: Single-tenant, net leased freestanding retail
- Revenue: ▲US$0.926 billion (2025)
- Net income: ▲US$0.389 billion (2025)
- Total assets: ▲US$9.3 billion (2025)
- Total equity: ▲US$7.9 billion (Q3 2026)
- Number of employees: 87 (2026)
- Rating: BBB+ (S&P) / Baa1 (Moody's)
- Website: www.nnnreit.com

NNN REIT, Inc. is a real estate investment trust that invests primarily in restaurant properties that are subject to long-term triple net leases, usually under leaseback arrangements. It is organized in Maryland with its principal office in Orlando, Florida.

As of September 30, 2026, the company owned 3,817 properties containing 40.8 million square feet, 17.6% of the company's revenue was from properties in Texas, and 8.7% of the company's revenue was from properties in Florida.

== History ==
The company was formed in 1984 as Golden Corral Realty Corp. as a way for the owners of the Golden Corral restaurant chain to allow employees to invest in the company.

In 1993, the company split from Golden Corral, and changed its name to Commercial Net Lease Realty. The company also moved its listing to the New York Stock Exchange.

On January 1, 1998, the company merged with its former external adviser, CNL Realty Advisor Inc., and became a self-advised, self-managed REIT.

In February 2004, Craig Macnab was named chief executive officer of the company. In May 2004, he was also named president.

In 2005, the company acquired National Properties Corporation for $61 million.

In May 2006, the company changed its name to National Retail Properties, Inc.

In April 2022, Jay Whitehurst retired and Stephen Horn became CEO & President of the company.

In May 2023, the company changed its name to NNN REIT, Inc. to better reflect their stock ticker.
