= Bob Wian =

American restaurateur (1914–1992)

- Wian c. 1948
- Born: June 15, 1914; Philadelphia, Pennsylvania, U.S.
- Died: March 31, 1992 (aged 77); Newport Beach, California, U.S.
- Burial place: Pacific View Memorial Park, Corona del Mar, California, U.S.
- Occupations: Restaurateur; businessman; fry cook
- Years active: 1933–1969
- Known for: Founding Bob's Big Boy and the national Big Boy chain; inventing the double-deck hamburger
- Board member of: Robert C. Wian Enterprises; National Big Boy Association; Marriott Corporation
- Spouses: Frances Abbott (m. 1935; div. 1956) June Ealey Baehler (m. 1957)

Mayor of Glendale, California
- In office October 1948 – April 1949
- Preceded by: Joseph F. Baudino
- Succeeded by: George R. Wickham

Robert C. Wian (June 15, 1914 – March 31, 1992) was an American businessman and restaurateur best known as the founder of the Big Boy restaurant chain. Wian began the chain as a 10-stool hamburger stand in Glendale, California, opening in 1936 with an investment of $300 raised from the sale of his car. He sold Bob's Big Boy and rights to the Big Boy chain to the Marriott Corporation in 1967 for $7 million ($68 million in 2025).

== Biography ==
Wian was born in Philadelphia, Pennsylvania, to Robert E. Wian and his wife Cora. The Wians moved to Glendale in 1924 while the younger Wian was still a child. Wian served as the mayor of the city of Glendale from October 1948 to April 1949 replacing a mayor who was removed by a recall election. He continued on the city council but resigned in August 1948, citing conflicts with Bob's Big Boy and "a desire to make an occasional fishing trip". Wian was also a member of the service organization 20-30 Club, serving as president of the local Glendale club, governor of the Southern California district, and as national trustee.

After selling Big Boy, Wian remained as a Marriott vice-president and president of the "Big Boy Restaurants of America" division for about a year, then sat on the Marriott board for an additional year before retiring. As a board member, Wian recommended Marriott approach his friend Roy Rogers about the use of his name to rebrand the corporation's RoBee's Roast Beef chain.

Wian married Frances Abbott in 1935, who bore his only natural son, Robert Paul "Bobby" Wian (1936–1973). Following his divorce from Abbott in 1956, he married June Ealey Baehler in 1957, becoming step-father to her son, Chapman "Chappy" Baehler, and daughter Barbara Baehler. The couple also adopted a son, Casey, and daughter, Julie. His joy in Casey and Julie, and his time with them too limited by business, influenced his decision to sell Big Boy.

Wian retired in the 1970s and enjoyed outdoor activities on his 800-acre ranch in Valyermo, California, where he lived until relocating to Newport Beach in 1985. He died in Newport Beach on March 31, 1992, at the age of 77.
