= Stephen Bollenbach =

American financial manager and hotel executive

- Born: Stephen Frasier Bollenbach; July 14, 1942
- Died: October 8, 2016 (aged 74)
- Occupation: Business executive
- Known for: President and chief executive of Hilton Hotels Corporation (1996–2007)

Stephen Frasier Bollenbach (July 14, 1942 – October 8, 2016) was a financial manager and former CEO and CFO for many hotel-related organizations. After working with financier Daniel K. Ludwig from 1968 to 1980, he oversaw mergers and acquisitions for various corporations such as the Marriott Corporation, Holiday Corporation, Harrah's Entertainment, the Trump Organization, Disney, and Hilton Hotels. He was on numerous corporate boards, including the non-executive chairman of Los Angeles-based KB Home and a member of the board of directors of Time Warner. Additionally, Bollenbach was on the board of directors for American International Group during the 2008 financial crisis, and was also a director of Harrah's Entertainment, Inc., Macy's, Inc., and the Los Angeles World Affairs Council.

== Education ==
Bollenbach attended Lakewood High School (California), graduated from Long Beach City College, earned a bachelor's degree in finance from UCLA in 1965, and a master's degree in management from the California State University, Northridge in 1968.

== Career ==
=== Ludwig Group ===
From 1968 until 1980 Bollenbach held a series of financial management positions with the Ludwig Group and helped to oversee some of his hotel properties. Bollenbach had been introduced to the organization by John L. Notter, who ultimately spent 15 years as the operating head of the D.K. Ludwig Group and became the chairman of the Ludwig Cancer Research. Bollenbach worked for Mr Ludwig for many years, helping to oversee some of his hotel properties. This work with Ludwig culminated as Bollenbach was D. K. Ludwig's CFO from 1977 to 1980.

Bollenbach was chairman and chief executive officer of Southwest Savings and Loan Association in Phoenix from 1980 to 1982.

=== 1982: Marriott ===
He was senior vice president of finance and treasurer for the Marriott Corporation from 1982 to 1986. In 1982, the company acquired Host International for $120 million and also Gino's Inc., the owner of Gino's Hamburgers and Rustler Steak House restaurant chains, for $48.6 million. 108 Rustler Steak House Restaurants plus three other restaurants were sold in the following year to two different firms (Tenly Enterprises and Sizzler Restaurants International) for undisclosed amounts. Newly formed Tenly Enterprises purchased 94 restaurants while Sizzler Restaurants International purchased the remaining 17. The Gino's chain had 359 company-owned locations when Marriott Corporation acquired it in 1982. Marriott discontinued the brand and converted locations to its Roy Rogers Restaurants chain. The last Gino's, located in Pasadena, Maryland and owned independently from Marriott, closed in 1986.

=== 1986: Holiday Corp. ===
He then was chief financial officer and a member of the board of directors of Holiday Corporation from 1986 to 1990. Holiday Inns, Inc. was renamed "Holiday Corporation" in 1985 to reflect the growth of the company's brands, including Harrah's Entertainment, Embassy Suites Hotels, Crowne Plaza, Homewood Suites, and Hampton Inn. In 1988, Holiday Corporation was purchased by UK-based Bass PLC (the owners of the Bass beer brand). During his time at Holiday, Bollenbach helped prevent Trump from using a leveraged buyout to take over the hotel chain.

=== 1990–1992: Trump Organization ===
After a brief stint with Promus Companies (a corporate spin-off affiliated with Caesars Entertainment and Harrah's Entertainment) in 1990, Bollenbach became the first CFO of the Trump Organization in 1990 while Allen Weisselberg worked under him as comptroller.

=== 1992–1995: Marriott ===
Bollenbach returned as an executive for Marriott Hotels in 1992

=== 1995–1995 Disney ===
In 1995, Bollenbach replaced Richard Nanula as the CFO for Disney. In this position, he crafted Disney's $19-billion deal to buy Capital Cities/ABC in 1995.

=== 1996–2007 Hilton ===
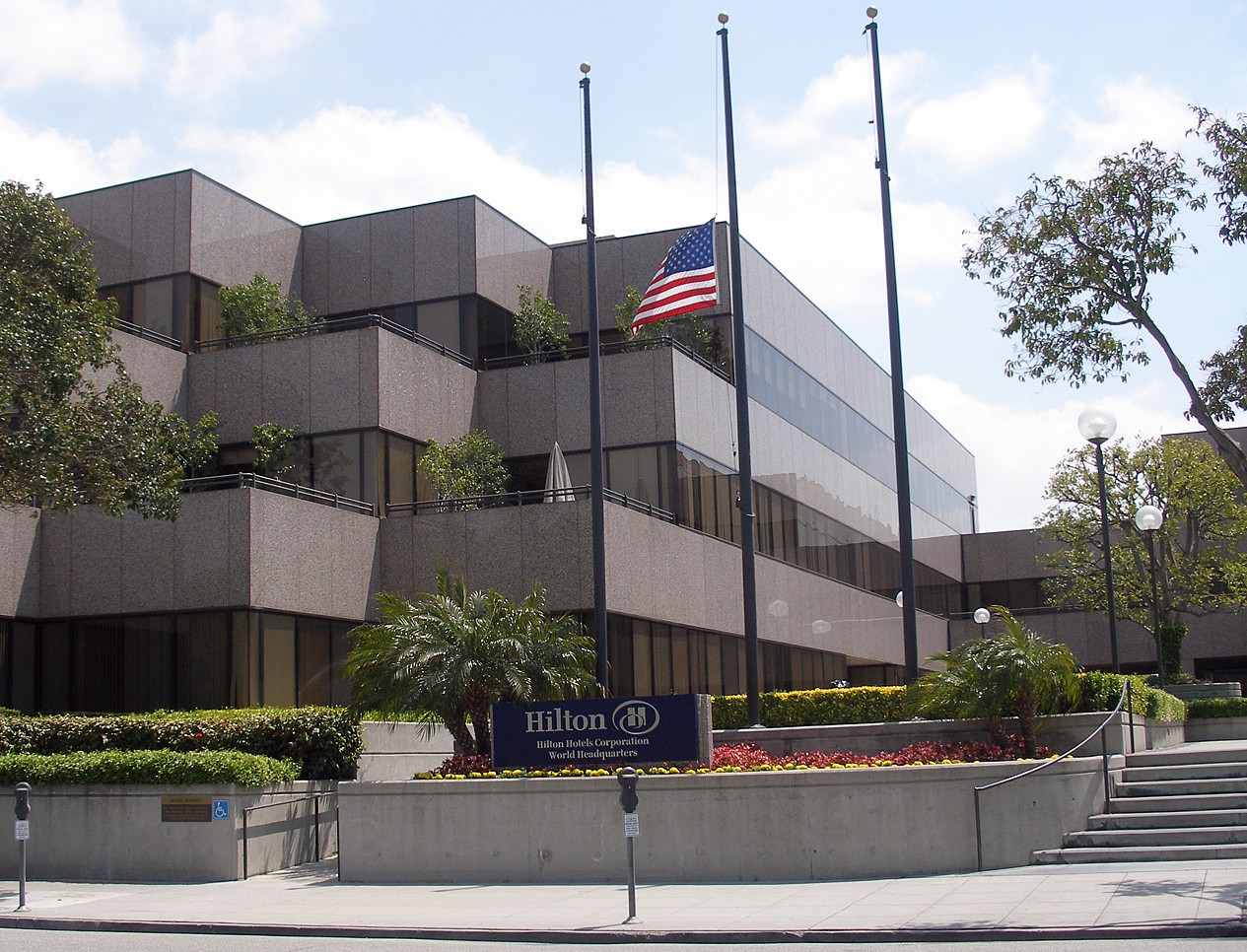
Hilton Hotels Corporation headquarters, Beverly Hills (2007)

Bollenbach was the co-chairman and chief executive officer of Hilton Hotels Corporation beginning in February 1996. He was the first person outside the Hilton Family to hold this position. Bollenbach aimed to expand Hilton's gaming holdings through acquisitions, especially in Atlantic City, where Hilton had no presence. Bally Entertainment, with five casinos, including two in Atlantic City, was a natural target. Its midscale clientele, heavy on slots revenue, would provide balance to the volatility of Hilton's high-end baccarat players. Hilton beat out ITT Corporation with an offer of $2 billion in stock plus $1 billion of assumed debt, and the purchase closed in December 1996. In August 1996, Hilton Hotels Corporation and Ladbroke Group, the owner of Hilton International, announced a worldwide alliance to reunite the Hilton brand outside and inside the United States; Bollenbach and Ladbroke's chief executive, Peter George, were each to join the other company's board. The two companies' cooperation on sales, marketing and loyalty programs began in early 1997. Bollenbach served as a non-executive director of Hilton Group (as Ladbroke Group became in 1999) until December 2005, when Hilton Hotels Corporation agreed to buy its hotel business. This alliance ultimately paved the way for the 2006 acquisition of Hilton International by Hilton Hotels Corporation. In 2007, Bollenbach left after making the sale of Hilton to The Blackstone Group for $26 Billion.

=== 2008–2009 AIG ===
In January 2008 he was elected to the board of directors for American International Group, Inc. (AIG). At that time he was also listed as "Chairman of the Board of KB Home and a Director of Harrah’s Entertainment, Inc., Time Warner Inc. and Macy’s, Inc. He also was a member of the Board of Directors of Teach for America and Los Angeles World Affairs Council." AIG was a central player in the 2008 financial crisis. It was bailed out by the federal government for $180 billion, and the government took control.") In June of 2008, AIG fired Chief Executive Officer Martin Sullivan, replaced him with Robert Willumstad as CEO and appointed Bollenbach as "lead independent director." Willumstad left after three months on the job and was replaced by Chairman and Chief Executive Officer Edward M. Liddy, who was dismissed by the board in May 2009. after this resignation and AIG's announcement that it would name six new independent directors, Bollenbach himself left in 2009 along with Martin Feldstein, James Orr, Virginia Rometty, Michael Sutton, Edmund Tse, and Ed Liddy after working on bailout.

== Personal life, and death ==
According to a Ludwig Cancer Research Center memorial, “He was an avid traveler who loved to ski, drive sports cars, golf and collect wine. Steve established the Bollenbach Family Scholarship, which sends 15 deserving and financially challenged students each year to college.”

Bollenbach divorced his first wife Barbara in 2010. He married Kimberly in 2011. At his death, he and his wife lived in East Gate Bel Air section of Los Angeles, California. He had two grown sons (by his first wife) Christopher and Keat, and two grandchildren. He died at the age of 74 after a long illness in Manhattan, New York on October 8, 2016.
