= Joe Campanella =

American football player and executive (1930–1967)

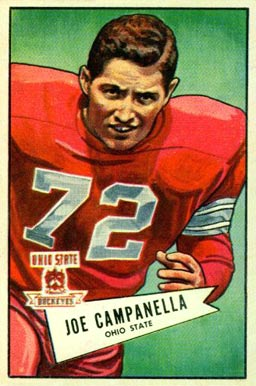
- Campanella on a 1952 Bowman football card

No. 73
- Positions: Linebacker, defensive tackle

Personal information
- Born: September 3, 1930; Cleveland, Ohio, U.S.
- Died: February 15, 1967 (aged 36); Baltimore, Maryland, U.S.
- Listed height: 6 ft 2 in (1.88 m)
- Listed weight: 242 lb (110 kg)

Career information
- High school: Cathedral Latin (Chardon, Ohio)
- College: Ohio State
- NFL draft: 1952: 3rd round, 36th overall pick

Career history

Playing
- Cleveland Browns (1952)*; Dallas Texans (1952); Baltimore Colts (1953–1957)
- * Offseason or practice squad member only

Operations
- Baltimore Colts (1966–1967) Vice president/General manager

Career NFL statistics
- Games played: 68
- Games started: 39
- Interceptions: 3
- Fumble recoveries: 3
- Stats at Pro Football Reference
- Executive profile at Pro Football Reference

Joseph Arthur Campanella (September 3, 1930 – February 15, 1967) was an American professional football player and executive in the National Football League (NFL). Campanella played linebacker and defensive tackle for six seasons for the Dallas Texans and the Baltimore Colts. He played college football for the Ohio State Buckeyes and was selected by the Cleveland Browns in the third round of the 1952 NFL draft. He later served as the general manager of the Baltimore Colts from 1966–1967.

== Early life ==
Joe Campanella was born in Cleveland, Ohio on September 3, 1930. He attended Cathedral Latin School where he played football, ran track and field, and participated in Golden Gloves boxing.

== College career ==
Campanella played college football at Ohio State, where he played tackle. Campanella's time with Ohio State was cut short by military service. Campanella joined the U.S. Air Force and was stationed at nearby Lockbourne Air Force Base while continuing to attend classes at Ohio State. A military ruling disallowed airmen from playing sports while attending civilian schools, which led Campanella to forego his final two years of college eligibility to enter the NFL draft.

== Professional career ==
Campanella was selected by the Cleveland Browns in the third round of the 1952 NFL draft as the 36th overall selection. He spent the 1952 offseason training with the Browns, but was traded to the Dallas Texans prior to the start of the season for quarterback George Ratterman.

Campanella played with Dallas for the 1952 season, appearing in all 12 games with six starts. Midway through the 1952 season, the Texans' owners sold the franchise to the NFL who operated Dallas as a traveling team based in Hershey, Pennsylvania.

In 1953, Campanella and the other Texans players became part of the newly formed Baltimore Colts. Although the Colts were technically an expansion team, they retained the Texans' roster. For the 1953 season, Campanella was moved to offensive tackle. In 1954, he returned to defense where he played middle guard (now known as defensive tackle) alongside defensive linemen Don Joyce, Art Donovan, and Gino Marchetti. Campanella retired as a player following the 1957 season to pursue other business ventures.

During his six-year career, Campanella appeared in 68 games with 39 starts and recorded three interceptions and three fumble recoveries.

== Post-football career ==
=== Restaurateur ===
After retiring from professional football, Campanella was encouraged by Baltimore Colts owner Carroll Rosenbloom to pool his money with Alan Ameche and Louis Fischer, who was Campanella's classmate from The Ohio State University, to invest in restaurants. The partners' first store, called "Ameche's Drive-In" in Glen Burnie, Maryland, featured the Powerhouse and Kingfish sandwiches served with the Special "35" Sauce. The number of stores slowly grew beyond the flagship drive-in.

In the early 1960s Ameche, Fischer, and Campanella wanted to expand, and were able to convince future Pro Football Hall of Fame member Gino Marchetti to join their restaurant group. The newly-branded restaurants became Gino's Hamburgers.

Campanella left the group in 1963 and started his own restaurant, Rustler Steak House, and later sold it after opening five stores. He returned to Gino's with his original partners after less than a year. The Rustler restaurants later changed hands when Marriott Corporation sold the chain to Tenly Enterprises in 1973. It was again sold in 1985 to Collins Foods.

=== Broadcasting ===
Campanella served as the color commentator for television broadcasts of Baltimore Colts games during the 1966 season.

== NFL executive career ==
During the 1966 season, Baltimore Colts general manager Red Kellett announced his plans to retire at the end of the year. Colts owner Carroll Rosenbloom appointed Campanella the team's vice president and general manager while Kellett completed the season, and was set to officially take his position in 1967. Campanella was close friends with then-Colts head coach Don Shula, whom he had played with in Baltimore from 1953 to 1956.

== Death ==
Campanella died on February 15, 1967, at the age of 36, after collapsing during a handball game with Shula and Colts defensive line coach Bill Arnsparger. He was rushed to Maryland General Hospital where he was pronounced dead of a heart attack.

Rosenbloom and the entire Colts organization were in shock. Shula tearfully remarked, "He was just a wonderful human being; one of my closest friends." Gino Marchetti was overcome with grief at Campanella's funeral, saying: "If I live to be 100, I will never meet a better friend. He showed me the right directions to go: in business, and spiritually by bringing me back to the church. He meant to me what air means to the body. If you want to know what a real man is like, well man, he was!"
