= Gino Marchetti =

American football player (1926–2019)

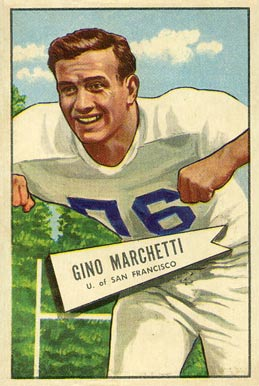
- 1952 Bowman football card

No. 75, 89
- Positions: Defensive end, offensive tackle

Personal information
- Born: January 2, 1926; Smithers, West Virginia, U.S.
- Died: April 29, 2019 (aged 93); Paoli, Pennsylvania, U.S.
- Listed height: 6 ft 4 in (1.93 m)
- Listed weight: 244 lb (111 kg)

Career information
- High school: Antioch (Antioch, California)
- College: Modesto JC (1950), San Francisco (1951)
- NFL draft: 1952: 2nd round, 14th overall pick

Career history
- Dallas Texans (1952); Baltimore Colts (1953–1964, 1966)

Awards and highlights
- 2× NFL champion (1958, 1959); 9× First-team All-Pro (1956–1964); Second-team All-Pro (1955); 11× Pro Bowl (1954–1964); NFL sacks leader (1960); NFL 1950s All-Decade Team; NFL 50th Anniversary All-Time Team; NFL 75th Anniversary All-Time Team; NFL 100th Anniversary All-Time Team; Baltimore Ravens Ring of Honor; Indianapolis Colts No. 89 retired; First-team All-PCC (1951); Second-team All-PCC (1950)

Career NFL statistics
- Interceptions: 1
- Fumble recoveries: 13
- Sacks: 56
- Total touchdowns: 3
- Military career
- Allegiance: United States
- Branch: U.S. Army
- Service years: 1944–1946
- Unit: 69th Infantry Division
- Conflicts: World War II; Battle of the Bulge
- Stats at Pro Football Reference
- Pro Football Hall of Fame

Gino John Marchetti (/mɑːrˈkɛtiː/ mar-KET-ee; January 2, 1926 – April 29, 2019) was an American professional football player who was a defensive end and offensive tackle in the National Football League (NFL). He played in 1952 for the Dallas Texans and from 1953 to 1966 for the Baltimore Colts.

He was inducted into the Pro Football Hall of Fame in 1972. In 1969, Marchetti was named to the National Football League 50th Anniversary All-Time Team. In 1994, Marchetti was named to the National Football League 75th Anniversary All-Time Team. In 2019, he was unanimously named to the NFL 100th Anniversary All-Time Team. He is one of only six players to be on the 50th, 75th and 100th anniversary teams, along with his Baltimore Colts teammate Johnny Unitas.

== Early life ==
=== Family background ===
Marchetti was born near Smithers, West Virginia, just south of the capital, Charleston, in Kayford, West Virginia. He was the son of Italian immigrants Ernesto (later Ernest) and Maria (Dalforte) from Lucca, Italy in Tuscany. Not wanting a coal mining life, the family moved to Antioch, California when Marchetti was young, where Ernest opened the Nevada Club which served food and drinks, and operated legal poker games.

Ernest became an American citizen, but Maria did not because of paperwork issues. At the beginning of World War II, when America was at war with Italy, she was originally assigned to an internment camp. Even after she was no longer subject to being interned as an enemy alien, she was cast out of Antioch as a supposed threat to national security. The family moved a few miles outside of Antioch. While the rest of the family, including Marchetti who was attending Antioch high school, could go into Antioch, Maria could not. This was so even though she already had one son in the army and Marchetti was about to enlist. In a 2000 interview with Baltimore sportswriter John Steadman, Marchetti stated that he and his parents did not hold a grudge over his mother's treatment by the government, and emphasized his parents love for America.

=== Military service ===
In 1944, while a high school senior and only 17 years old, Marchetti enlisted in the U.S. Army. He still received a high school diploma because he enlisted. He became a member of the 273rd Unit of the U.S. Army's Sixty-ninth Infantry, which originally was sent to London. Marchetti arrived for combat in Europe around the time of the end of the Battle of the Bulge as a machine gunner. He fought initially in Germany at the Siegfried Line. Among his experiences, Marchetti said, "'The first time I saw snow, I slept in it...." His company was the first to make contact with Russian soldiers during the war's end.

Reflecting upon his World War II experience in a 2009 interview, Marchetti called it "life altering" and said "If I had not gone to the Army, what probably would have happened to me is, I would have gone to one of the factories, worked until I was 65, retired, and that would have been my life. That's what they did in Antioch. Because the war was coming to an end, I could have probably stayed home, graduated [from high school] and never had to go. But it was the best thing I ever did. It gave me the discipline that I needed in my life." The Army also made Marchetti a leader, including as a football player, where he understood leadership meant it was necessary to take action to overcome problems the team faced, which he would do by attacking the problem.

=== College football and the 1951 Dons ===
Marchetti during his junior year at USF, 1950.

Marchetti returned home to Antioch from the Army in 1946. He played semipro football for the Antioch Hornets in 1947. He later attended Modesto Junior College for one year before joining the football program at the University of San Francisco (USF). Marchetti was able to go to Modesto on the GI Bill, and earned a scholarship to USF.

The USF Dons enjoyed an undefeated season in 1951. In addition to Marchetti, that team had two other future NFL Hall of Fame players, Ollie Matson and Bob. St. Clair. A number of other teammates were also future NFL players. Linebacker Burl Toler's NFL playing career ended before it started when he suffered a shattering knee injury during a college all-star game in 1952. Toler later became an NFL head linesman in 1965, making him the first African American game official in any major professional American sports league. The team's young publicist was Pete Rozelle, who went on to become NFL commissioner and another hall of famer. The team was coached by future NFL coach Joe Kuharich. Marchetti was named a Dons captain, a role he would later serve for the Baltimore Colts in the NFL.

The Dons were invited to the 1951 Orange Bowl, which was played in Florida, but only on the condition that the Dons two African American players, Matson and Toler, did not participate because of racial segregation practices. Kuharich informed all 33 of the players of the conditions set for their playing in this major bowl game, and they unanimously rejected the offer to play the game if Matson and Toler were barred. Matson remembered it as Marchetti being the one to say no, with the understanding that he spoke the sentiments of the group, and Marchetti remembered it as not solely coming from him, but from every Don player actively standing up for Matson and Toler.

Marchetti believed his mother's poor treatment in Antioch may have been the source of his standing up for Matson and Toler. He was once in a bar with Toler and two white players (Ed Brown and Scooter Scudero), and they were refused service because Toler was black. Upset for Toler at the time, and even considering roughing up the bar, Marchetti told Toler how his mother had been kicked out of Antioch.

Marchetti and Matson were inducted into the NFL hall of fame on the same day in 1972, the first year they were eligible for inclusion. In Toler's early years as an NFL linesman, he was working a game between the Colts and Green Bay Packers in Milwaukee. At halftime, Marchetti rushed up to Toler and warmly embraced his former teammate. Toler was touched, but told Marchetti, "'Gino' ... 'you can't do this. What will the Packers think?'"

Marchetti was selected in the second round of the 1952 NFL draft (14th overall) by the New York Yanks. In 2004, Marchetti was voted to the East-West Shrine Game Hall of Fame.

== Professional career ==
Marchetti was 26 when he played his first NFL game. During his rookie season, the Yanks became the Dallas Texans, which became the Baltimore Colts in 1953. Marchetti played 13 seasons with the Colts and helped them win NFL Championships in 1958 and 1959. During his career, he was noted for being effective against the run and a relentless pass-rusher. He was voted "the greatest defensive end in pro football history" by the Pro Football Hall of Fame in 1972.

In Dallas, he once volunteered to substitute at tight end because there was no one else left to play the position, and caught a touchdown pass. Colts coach Keith Molesworth moved Marchetti to left offensive tackle in 1954, a position Marchetti hated, but admitted that it taught him how to beat a blocker. The following year, new coach, future hall of famer Weeb Ewbank, returned Marchetti to defensive end, and Marchetti made his first Pro Bowl.

He made a big play in the 1958 NFL Championship Game when he prevented the New York Giants from gaining a first down by tackling Frank Gifford just a foot short of the first down mark. He fractured his ankle on that same play but, as a team captain, insisted on watching the rest of the historic overtime contest from the sideline with his teammates rather than seeking immediate medical attention in the locker room. He eventually was taken to the locker room as the game went into overtime. After the Colts won, the team presented Marchetti with the game ball. Sometimes called the "Greatest Game Ever Played", Marchetti said it should be more accurately called the most important game ever played.

The broken ankle injury forced him to miss the Pro Bowl that year, which was the only time he did not appear in the Pro Bowl game from 1955 to 1965. In addition to being an 11-time Pro Bowler, Marchetti was First-team All-Pro nine times and a Second-team selection once. He was voted most valuable player of the 1963 Pro Bowl.

Quarterback sacks were not kept as an official statistic during Marchetti's playing years, but informal records kept after 1960 indicate that Marchetti had 56 sacks from ages 34 to 39, past his prime. Baltimore Colts unofficial team records had him with 43 sacks in one single 12-game season during his prime, well past the current NFL season record. Marchetti himself recalled nine sacks in a single game. Hall of fame quarterback Bobby Layne "said being sacked by Marchetti was like 'running into a tree trunk in the dark.'"

Marchetti's stellar play led to his being called by Sid Gillman, the Los Angeles Rams head coach, "(T)he greatest player in football. It's a waste of time to run around this guy's end. It's a lost play. You don't bother to try it."

His Hall of Fame teammate Art Donovan had this to say about him: "For his first couple of years with the Colts, Gino Marchetti was our enforcer. Gino was a tough kid from the ghetto.... An Antioch recruiter had spotted the big hulk at the racetrack one day and brought him along to the head coach. He immediately became a star. He could also kick some ass, and that particular talent gained him quite a reputation as not only perhaps the greatest defensive end to ever play the game, but also as a dirty, cheap-shot artist. Then one day Gino was born again, so to speak. He had just brought down Detroit's marvelous halfback Doak Walker, and he couldn't resist digging the heel of his hand into Walker's schnozz as he was getting up off the ground. But instead of starting a fight or yelling anything, Walker just looked at him. Didn't say a word, just stared at Gino. Gino felt like a piece of shit. 'I could see it in his eyes,' he said later. 'A big guy like me, with probably eighty pounds and six inches on Walker, having to resort to a mean, lowdown trick like that. That look of disgust reformed me. I'm no longer the hatchet man around here.' Which, of course, did not mean that Gino stopped getting his licks in. Everyone gets their licks in playing football."

Marchetti's Colts teams included a number of African American players, like NFL hall of famers Lenny Moore and Jim Parker (both on the NFL's 100th Anniversary All-Time Team, like Marchetti, and their Colt teammates, Johnny Unitas and Raymond Berry), Eugene "Big Daddy" Lipscomb, Sherman Plunkett, and Lenny Lyles, among other key players on those teams. The disparate and disrespectful treatment of the team's black players over the years later caused former Colts star and Heisman trophy winner Alan Ameche to ask Lenny Moore how the black and white players could all have even held together as a great team. Moore's later response to Ameche's speculation was "'I don't know either ... but I think it was something inside Gino Marchetti.'"

He was enshrined in the Bay Area Sports Hall of Fame in 1985. He is also a member of Modesto Junior College Athletic Hall of Fame Class of 1990, and the National Italian American Sports Hall of Fame. In 2021, the Athletic listed him as the 34th greatest player in NFL history. Football Digest listed him as the 40th greatest player in NFL history in its turn of the century list. In 1999, the Sporting News listed him as the 15th greatest player of all time. Marchetti's number had been retired by the Colts in Baltimore, and then briefly unretired after the team moved to Indianapolis, but quickly retired again after an uproar over the change. Marchetti did not favor the team's move to Indianapolis, and sometimes even rooted against that team, believing the team name Colts should have been left to the City of Baltimore. Of his Colts and their connection to Baltimore, Marchetti said, "'We were like the great high school team in a small town.'"

Hall of fame offensive tackle, and former NFL coach, Forrest Gregg, who had to face Marchetti, said Marchetti was the greatest player he ever played against. Gregg said in an interview: "You ask who was the best ... just my opinion, Marchetti was the best all-around player I ever played against. Great pass rusher. Great against the run. And he never let you rest."

Marchetti, who always called Unitas "kid", was one of the rare people that Johnny Unitas looked up to. In turn, Marchetti appreciated Unitas for his honesty with himself and others, and his workmanlike, no-excuses, no-nonsense leadership as a quarterback. Raymond Berry described the team's two leaders as each having an unusual blend of humility and self-confidence.

Marchetti was instrumental in hall of fame coach Don Shula getting his first head coaching position, which was with the Baltimore Colts. Shula believed Marchetti revolutionized defensive end play through the use of techniques to get past the offensive tackles trying to block him, rather than only using the pure force of bull rushes.

== Restaurant ==
Ad for Ameche's Drive-Through and Gino's Hamburgers from a 1962 Colts game program.

With the encouragement and partial financial support of Colts owner Caroll Rosenbloom, Marchetti joined a fast-food restaurant business with Colts teammates Alan Ameche, Joe Campanella, and Louis Fisher. In 1959, Ameche-Gino Foods Inc. opened its first Gino's. The business grew, began to franchise, and would eventually become known as Gino's Hamburgers. It was a successful Mid-Atlantic regional fast-food chain and had 313 company-owned locations when they were sold in 1982 to Marriott International, which abandoned the name in favor of their Roy Rogers restaurants.

In 2009, Marchetti teamed with other former key Gino's employees to resurrect the Gino's name. Hiring commenced in September 2010 to staff their first new restaurant in the company's old hometown of King of Prussia, Pennsylvania, and Gino's Burgers & Chicken, as the company is now known, opened its first store on October 25, 2010. This restaurant has since closed. As of April 9, 2021, the chain operates restaurants in Glen Burnie, Maryland and Towson, Maryland.

== Death ==
Marchetti died of complications of pneumonia at Paoli Hospital in Paoli, Pennsylvania on April 29, 2019.

== Family ==
Marchetti's grandson Keith Carter played tight end for UCLA and later won a Super Bowl as a coach with the Seattle Seahawks.

After his marriage to Flora Etta Beck ended in divorce, Marchetti married Joan Plecenik in 1978. He had two daughters, Gina Burgess and Michelle Kapp, and two sons, John and Eric. Another grandson, Conner D. Marchetti.

== Awards and honors ==
- Pro Bowl Selection (1955–1965)
- All-NFL Selection (1956–1964)
- MVP 1963 Pro Bowl
- NFL 50th Anniversary Team as the defensive end (1969)
- Pro Football Hall of Fame (1972)
- Bay Area Sports Hall of Fame (1985)
- NFL 75th Anniversary Team (1994)
- All-Madden All-Millennium Team (2000)
- NFL All-Time Team (2000)
- NFL 100th Anniversary Team (2019) (#34)
- No. 39 on The Top 100: NFL's Greatest Players
- The Athtetic's top 100 players in NFL history (2021)
- In 1999, he was ranked number 15 on The Sporting News' list of the 100 Greatest Football Players, the second-highest-ranking defensive end behind Deacon Jones.
- National Italian American Sports Hall of Fame
- NFL 100 Greatest Players (#39) (2010)
- Modesto Junior College Hall Of Fame (1990)
- Antioch created a park and named it after Marchetti
