= Martin Buxbaum =

American poet, 1912-1991

Martin David Buxbaum (June 27, 1912 - March 20, 1991) was an American poet and public relations director with Marriott.

== Biography ==
Martin Buxbaum was born in Richmond, Virginia June 27, 1912. He received a Masters in Journalism from Cranston University. He was a member of the Middle Atlantic Association of Industrial Editors. He was manager of communications for Sealtest Corporation from 1947-53, where he was editor of The Southern Dairy, the employee publication of Southern Dairies, Inc. He joined Marriott's Hot Shoppes chain in 1953 and was Director of Communications for Marriott from 1953-1976. He was editor of Marriott's Tabletalk magazine. He retired from Marriott in 1978.

Buxbaum was Maryland's poet laureate in 1967. Some of his poems were patterned in the style of haiku. Some considered his poetry to be syrupy and old-fashioned, but he considered it folksy and understandable. He considered his influences to be Alfred, Lord Tennyson and "the American poets everyone used to memorize in grade school".

Buxbaum gave regularly to a fund for the blind.

== Works ==
=== Poetry ===
- Rivers of Thought
- Whispers in the Wind
- Once Upon a Dream
- The Underside of Heaven

=== Essay collections ===
- Around Our House
- Tabletalk for Family Fun
