= Rustler Steak House =

American steakhouse chain

Rustler Steak House was an American steakhouse chain. It was founded in 1963 by former professional football player Joe Campanella, who expanded the kitchen offering to steaks, baked potatoes, bread, soups, salads and checkered napkins. Campanella sold the new chain after opening five stores.

Gino's Hamburgers operated Rustler from 1971 through 1982 when the Marriott Corporation purchased Gino's, which it combined with the Roy Rogers chain. Marriott sold the Rustler chain in early 1983 to newly established Tenly Enterprises. Tenly closed some Rustler locations; in 1985, it sold the 108 remaining Rustler locations to Collins Foods.

== See also ==
- List of steakhouses
