= LSG Group =

Aviation Service Company

- Trade name: LSG Group
- Type: Aktiengesellschaft
- Founded: 1995
- Headquarters: Neu-Isenburg, Germany
- Area served: Worldwide
- Key people: Erdmann Rauer (CEO); Wilken Bormann (CFO)
- Brands: LSG Sky Chefs; Retail inMotion
- Revenue: €3.400 billion (2019)
- Number of employees: 35,679 (2019)
- Parent: Aurelius Group
- Website: lsg-group.com

LSG Group is an aviation services company that manages multiple brands, including LSG Sky Chefs and Retail inMotion. The company's world headquarters is located in Neu-Isenburg, near Frankfurt, Germany. Its North American headquarters is located in Irving, Texas, United States. It is a subsidiary of the Aurelius Group after being sold by former owner Lufthansa in 2023.

== History ==
- 1942 — American Airlines creates Sky Chefs, Inc. as a wholly owned subsidiary.
- 1966 — Deutsche Lufthansa creates LSG Lufthansa Service GmbH as a wholly owned subsidiary.
- 1979 — Sky Chefs moves its headquarters from New York to Irving, Texas in conjunction with American Airlines’ move to Fort Worth.
- 1982 — Sky Chefs becomes a subsidiary of American Airlines' newly formed holding company AMR Corporation.
- 1986 — Toronto-based Onex Capital Corporation acquires Sky Chefs from AMR for $170 million (C$99 million). Sky Chefs becomes a subsidiary of Onex Food Services Inc.
- 1993 — LSG acquires 25 percent of Sky Chefs from Onex for $75 million. LSG and Onex Food enter a joint marketing agreement to operate under the common brand "LSG Lufthansa Service/Sky Chefs."
- 1995
  - Onex acquires Caterair International Corp. for $516 million.
  - Lufthansa creates LSG Lufthansa Service Holding AG, a wholly owned subsidiary and holding company for all catering activities.
- 1998 — Onex acquires the airline catering operations of New York-based Ogden Corporation for $84.8 million.
- 1999 — LSG acquires an additional 23 percent of Sky Chefs.
- 2001 — LSG acquires Onex Corporation's remaining 47 percent stake in Sky Chefs for $827 million (C$1.3 billion).
- 2016 — LSG acquires Retail inMotion.
- 2018 — LSG launches Evertaste brand for packaged products.
- 2018 - LSG Sky Chefs co-founded the Airline Catering Association, which is based in Brussels, Belgium.
- 2020 - Gategroup acquired the European business of LSG Group.
- 2023 - The remaining international business of the LSG Group has been sold by Lufthansa to Aurelius Group.

== Corporate affairs ==
Under the LSG Sky Chefs brand, the company is a provider of in-flight catering services for the airline industry. In addition the company also provides extended services on other aspects of in-flight service including in-flight logistics, in-flight management, onboard retail management, and the management of airport lounges. In addition to catering to airplanes, LSG has expanded operations to include commercial trains. LSG Sky Chefs partners with more than 300 airlines worldwide across 214 airports and operates almost 210 customer service centers in 51 countries, producing around 591 million meals a year.

The airline carriers served by LSG Sky Chefs can vary from airport to airport, but some major customers are Lufthansa, Air New Zealand, American Airlines, Delta Air Lines, Asiana Airlines, Spirit Airlines, Swiss International Air Lines, United Airlines, Alaska Airlines, Korean Air, Finnair, airBaltic and Emirates. LSG Group also caters the ESA missions to the International Space Station with bonus food for the German astronauts.

== Criticism ==
In the United States, a 2019 AFL-CIO study found evidence of applying anti-union strategies and tactics despite LSG having publicly committed themselves to international human rights and labour standards, including organizing and collective bargaining rights. The 11,000 union members working for LSG (UNITE HERE (“UH”) is the labour union which represents LSG Sky Chefs) voted in June 2019 to authorize a strike in Aug. 13 as the union stated that wages at Sky Chefs were as low as $9.85 an hour and that more than half the workers make less than $11.35 an hour and couldn't afford health benefits. LSG Sky Chefs, however, strongly disagrees with the study's argument that European companies seek to locate in the Southern United States to avoid unions. According to LSG's response to the study, the company has, and continues to fully support workers’ rights and freedom of association.
