= Wag's =

American former restaurant chain

- Old photo scan of Wag's newspaper ad
- Industry: Casual dining & Pancake house
- Founded: 1975; 51 years ago
- Defunct: 1991; 35 years ago
- Fate: Closed
- Headquarters: Deerfield, Illinois, United States
- Area served: Chicago metropolitan area and Florida
- Parent: Walgreens (1975-1988); Marriott Corp. (1988–1991)

Wag's was a chain of casual dining (or "family") restaurants owned and operated by Walgreens in the 1970s and 1980s.

== History ==
Wag's was started in 1975 by Walgreens and was based on smaller restaurants that existed in some of the larger Walgreens stores.

They were modeled after restaurants like Denny's, Shoney's, and Big Boy in that they were mostly 24-hour establishments specializing in inexpensive fare such as hamburgers and breakfast.

Walgreens sold all 91 freestanding stores to Marriott Corporation in 1988, retaining only a few locations that were situated in malls. Soon after this, Marriott began selling off its assets. Unable to find a buyer for most of the restaurants, the Wag's chain was completely out of business by 1991. However, the 30 Wag's restaurants in the Chicago Metropolitan area were sold to Lunan Corporation (large Arby's franchisee in Chicago) and run by Lunan Family Restaurants. Over the course of 2 years, each Wag's restaurant continued to do business as Wag's until converted to a Shoney's restaurant. Lunan Family Restaurants went out of business in 1994 and Shoney's locations were sold to various chains or individuals. Marriott itself ceased operations in 1993, when they split into two new entities.

== See also ==
- Lunch counter
