= Dallas Texans (NFL) =

Team of the National Football League (NFL) for one season, 1952

Logo

General information
- Founded: January 29, 1952
- Stadium: Cotton Bowl (games 1–7) traveling team (games 8–12)
- Headquartered: Dallas, Texas (games 1–7); Hershey, Pennsylvania (games 8–12)
- Colors: Royal blue, silver, white

Personnel
- Owners: Giles Miller and Connell Miller (games 1–7); NFL (games 8–12)
- Head coach: Jim Phelan

Team history
- Dallas Texans (1952)

League / conference affiliations
- National Football League

The Dallas Texans played in the National Football League (NFL) for one season in 1952. They posted a record of 1–11.

Initially based in Dallas, the team was returned to the league in the middle of the season and became a traveling team based in Hershey, Pennsylvania, and Akron, Ohio.

Professional football returned to Dallas in 1960, as the American Football League (AFL) commenced operations with one of its eight charter members in Dallas, also called the Texans, while the NFL added the Dallas Cowboys. The AFL Dallas Texans would later move to Kansas City, Missouri, and be re-branded as the Chiefs in 1963.

After the team folded, the league awarded its assets to the new Baltimore Colts, who retained the team's blue-and-white colors. However, neither the Colts nor the NFL recognize the Texans or their previous incarnations dating back to 1913 as part of the Colts' legacy. Thus, as of 2025, the Dallas Texans are the most recent NFL team to fold and not have its legacy included in that of any other team.

== History ==
After the 1951 season, the financially troubled New York Yanks franchise was put on the market by Ted Collins, who had founded the franchise in 1944 as the Boston Yanks before moving it to New York City in 1949, rebranding them as the Bulldogs, and rebranded it again as the Yanks in 1950. The team had been barely competitive for most of its existence, even after being augmented by a merger with the Brooklyn Tigers in 1945. The Tigers were the successors of a charter NFL member, the Dayton Triangles, who themselves had dated from 1913. When Tigers owner Dan Topping bolted to the All-American Football Conference in 1946, the NFL awarded the Tigers' player contracts to the Yanks. Even after that, the Yanks only managed one winning season, in 1950.

After falling to find a buyer, Collins sold the team back to the League. On January 29, 1952, a Dallas-based group led by a pair of young millionaires, brothers Giles and Connell Miller, completed the purchase of what was ostensibly a new franchise: the first-ever major league sports team based in Texas. However, the Millers also acquired the entire Yanks roster in the sale; thus, for all intents and purposes, the brothers bought the Yanks and relocated them to Dallas. Purchase price for the team was $200,000 — with $100,000 paid up front and the balance paid in installments. This comparatively vast expansion fee by 1950s standards was used to allow the league to buy out the Yanks' lease at Yankee Stadium.

NFL owners voted 10–1 in favor of the sale and relocation, with Pittsburgh Steelers owner Art Rooney casting the lone dissenting vote.

Home games were set for the 75,000-seat Cotton Bowl, home stadium of the Southern Methodist University Mustangs. Three names were considered for the new franchise: the Rangers, the Rebels, or the Texans. The last-mentioned was eventually the moniker chosen.

=== 1952 season ===
The Millers believed that the growing state of Texas, with its longstanding support of college and high school football, would be a natural fit for the NFL to move farther south and west. With this in mind, Giles Miller declared, "There is room in Texas for all kinds of football."

However, the opening game against the New York Giants set the tone for the season and the franchise. While the Texans scored the first touchdown, they missed the extra point and did not score again, losing 24–6 in front of only 17,499 fans at the Cotton Bowl.

Fan interest quickly waned as the team collapsed to 0–9 and showed no sign of being competitive. In the four games the Texans played at the Cotton Bowl, they lost all four by an average of eighteen points, and drew a total of only 54,065 fans. This was by far the lowest in the NFL, and barely half of the 25,000 per game required for the team to break even. The crowds looked even smaller because of the spacious configuration of the Cotton Bowl.

The nadir came in a November 9 game against the Los Angeles Rams, a 27–6 blowout loss which attracted only 10,000 fans. As it turned out, this would be the last game the Texans would play in Texas. By this time, the Millers had sustained losses of $250,000, a staggering sum by 1950s standards, and were unable to meet payroll. The situation was exacerbated by the woeful ticket sales and an inability to get any financial support from local businesses – an important factor even in this decade – to cover these debts, or even operating expenses. Unlike present economic arrangements in which the NFL's multi-billion-dollar television contracts essentially underwrite the league's franchises, teams in this era had no hope of remaining solvent without local support. NFL games were not carried on national TV at all until 1953 (DuMont did carry New York Giants games in 1952, but the season-opening win against Dallas was not televised) and then only on the now-long-defunct DuMont Television Network, for a pittance compared to the contracts of today. Only two Texans games were televised: October 12 against the Bears in Chicago on ABC, and the Thanksgiving game (see below), also against the Bears, on DuMont.

The Millers concluded they were in over their heads running an NFL team despite their wealth. They sold the team back to the league on November 14, with five games remaining in the season. Afterwards, the NFL moved the franchise's operations temporarily to Hershey, Pennsylvania (though it kept the Dallas Texans name), and moved the Texans' last two home games out of Dallas, thus making them a traveling team.

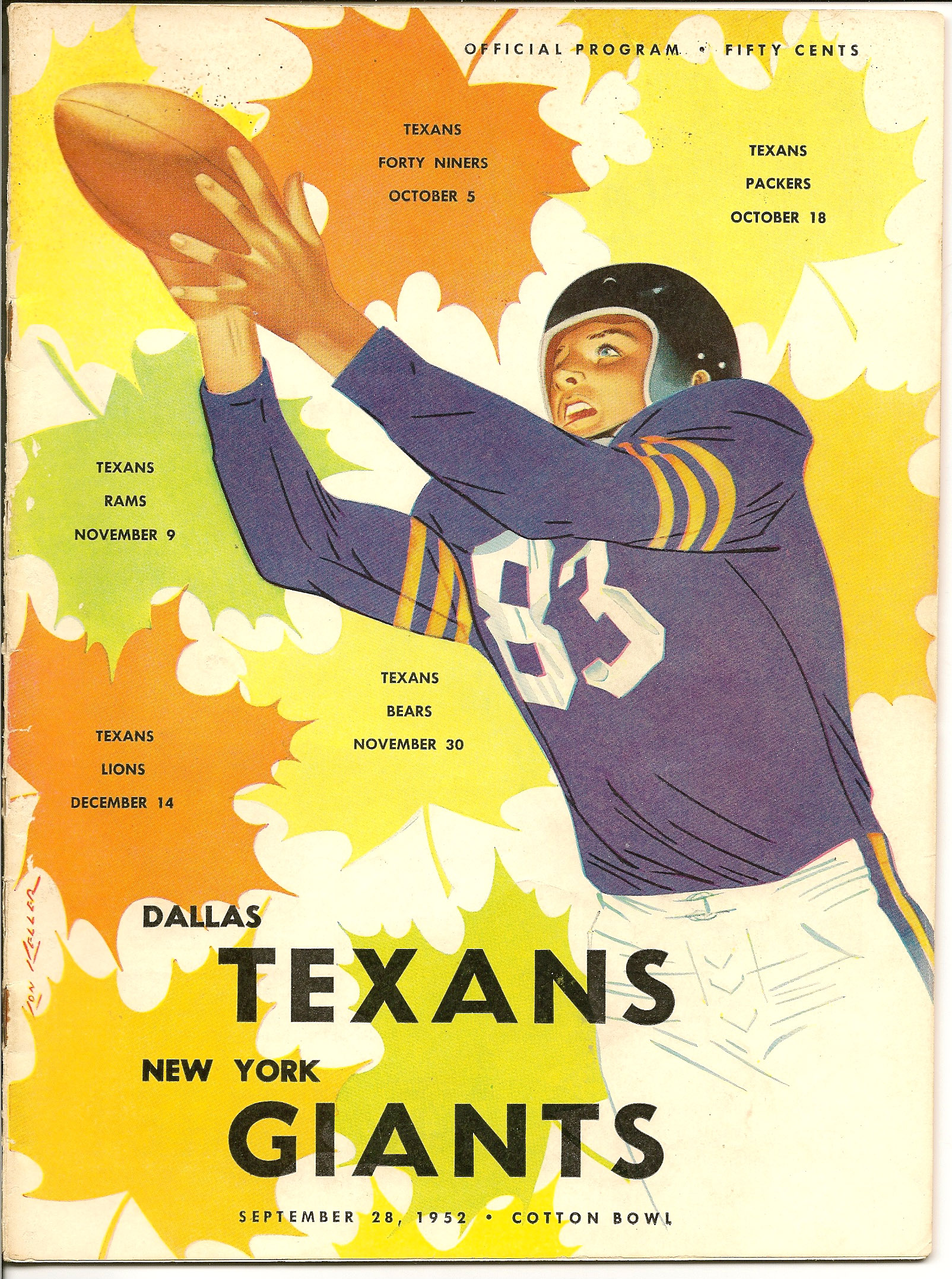
Program from first-ever game played by Dallas Texans in 1952

The team played one of its remaining two relocated home games at the Rubber Bowl in Akron, Ohio, where the franchise tallied its only win under the Texans moniker, an upset over the Chicago Bears of George Halas, in front of a meager crowd of only 2,208 fans on Thanksgiving Day. This remains the smallest crowd at any NFL game since 1939 (excluding 2020, when the COVID-19 pandemic severely limited attendance).

As a measure of how low the NFL ranked on the sports scene in the early 1950s, the Akron high school Championship Game played at the Rubber Bowl that morning attracted 14,284 fans, far outdrawing the afternoon's professional contest.

Head coach Jim Phelan jokingly suggested because of the small turnout, the Texans players should "go into the stands and shake hands with each fan," while Halas had been so certain that the Bears would overpower the lowly Texans that he started only his second-string players. The Texans jumped out to a 20–2 lead, and after a Bears rally, scored a touchdown with 34 seconds left for an upset 27–23 win.

With the victory, the NFL avoided having a franchise with a winless regular season, something that had not happened since 1944.

The team's final game was a 41–6 blowout loss at the hands of the Detroit Lions: while this game had been scheduled to be played in Dallas, it was moved to Detroit after the league took over the team, thus forcing the Texans (who were the designated home team) to make their second trip of the year to Briggs Stadium – this game drew 12,252 fans, less than one-third of the average for the Lions' home games that year. Two weeks later, the Lions won the NFL Championship.

Halfback George Taliaferro, the team's leading rusher, was selected to the Pro Bowl at the end of the season.

=== The end of the Texans ===
For all intents and purposes, the conclusion of the Texans' brief history was written before they even played their last game. Unable to find a buyer for the team, but not wanting to outright contract the franchise (which would have unbalanced the schedule), the NFL quickly began to solicit bids from other cities. The week after the Texans' Thanksgiving upset, the NFL granted a new franchise to a Baltimore-based ownership group headed by Carroll Rosenbloom, and awarded it the remaining assets (including the players) of the Texans organization. Rosenbloom named his new franchise the Baltimore Colts (after the unrelated previous team from the competing All-America Football Conference, which merged with the NFL in 1950).

The Colts, who now play in Indianapolis, do not claim the history of the Texans and their predecessors as their own, despite the Colts' inaugural roster including many of the players from the 1952 Texans, plus a number of players from the 1950-1951 Yanks. Likewise, the NFL reckons the Colts as a 1953 expansion team, not as a continuation of the Bulldogs/Yanks/Texans franchise or of the Triangles/Dodgers/Tigers franchise. As a result, the Texans are officially recognized as the last NFL team to permanently cease operations and not be included in the lineage of any current franchise.

=== After the Texans ===
Although the NFL rapidly grew more prosperous during the latter part of the 1950s (especially after the success of "The Greatest Game Ever Played", the 1958 Championship Game at Yankee Stadium between the vaunted New York Giants and the developing Colts, leading to a later profitable nationwide television contract), the 1952 debacle in Dallas left the NFL leery of further expansion.

Seeking a franchise in his home state and unable to persuade NFL owners to reconsider, Texas oil scion Lamar Hunt, with others, founded the American Football League as a direct competitor to the older NFL, with Hunt launching his own new Dallas Texans franchise.

Threatened by the new league and its impact upon attendances, player contract rates, and the television market, the NFL quickly reconsidered its position on expansion. In 1960, the NFL granted a franchise to the Dallas Cowboys. The Cowboys' first game as a franchise would be scheduled against the Steelers, eight years after the Steelers had voted against placing a team in Dallas. With fans in the Dallas–Fort Worth metroplex not forgetting this fact, combined with both teams being enormously successful in the following decades and establishing large fan bases in doing so, this would eventually lead to the Cowboys–Steelers rivalry.

Both franchises shared the Cotton Bowl stadium (also the home of Southern Methodist University's (SMU) Mustangs) for their first three seasons. The Cowboys were even more woeful on the field in their inaugural season, enduring a winless season with an 0-11-1 record, and would not post a winning record until 1966, while the AFL Texans, after going .500 over their first two seasons in the new league, would capture the 1962 AFL Championship after defeating the cross-state rival Houston Oilers in double overtime. Both teams also initially struggled to draw enough fans to the Cotton Bowl to turn a profit. However, unlike the Millers, Texans owner Hunt and Cowboys owner Clint Murchison, Jr. had the finances and the patience to absorb the massive losses.

Nevertheless, by the Texans' 1962 championship season, they were being consistently outdrawn at the gate by the Cowboys even though they had made a far better account of themselves on the field. Hunt realized that there was not nearly enough fan or corporate support for both teams. He relocated his team to Kansas City and rebranded them as the Chiefs, the second and last of two occasions that a professional American football champion has played the following season in another city. The other occasion was in 1945, with the NFL's Cleveland Rams. One month after winning the championship, franchise owner Dan Reeves, who had sustained five years of substantial financial losses, a situation that was exacerbated by poor home crowds and the pending arrival of the AAFC's Browns (who were to commence play the next year), relocated the Rams to Los Angeles.

=== Later use of the team name ===
In 1974, the World Football League placed a team in Texas called the Houston Texans. The team transferred to Shreveport, Louisiana before the 1974 season was finished.

The Texans nickname was later revived by the NFL for the Houston Texans, an expansion team awarded in 2002 to fill the void left after the Oilers relocated to Nashville, Tennessee in 1997, subsequently being rebranded as the Tennessee Titans.

== Notable players ==
=== Pro Football Hall of Fame ===
Dallas Texans Hall of Famers
Players
No.	Name	Position	Tenure	Inducted
70	Art Donovan	DT	1952	1968
75	Gino Marchetti	DE	1952	1972

=== Others ===
- Jack Adkisson, more famous as professional wrestler - Fritz Von Erich
- Joe Campanella, as Baltimore Colts' general manager in 1967
- Brad Ecklund
- Weldon Humble
- Chuck Ortmann
- George Taliaferro
- Frank Tripucka
- Buddy Young
- George Young, Baltimore high school and NFL coach with the Baltimore Colts, Miami Dolphins and general manager of the New York Giants, then later NFL executive staff.

== First round draft selection ==
Dallas Texans first-round draft picks
Year	Player name	Position	College	Notes
1952	Les Richter	G	California	Pick was actually made by the New York Yanks on January 17: the Yanks picks were subsequently given to Dallas.

After Richter, a star at the University of California, made it clear he did not want to play for Dallas, he was traded to the Los Angeles Rams, sending him closer to home. While the Rams sent a whopping eleven players to Dallas in exchange - still the second-biggest trade involving a single player in NFL history as of 2024 - the deal turned out to be very lopsided in the Rams' favor.

Richter went on to play nine seasons in Los Angeles and be elected to the Pro Football Hall of Fame, while of the eleven players sent to Dallas, defensive back/end Tom Keane was the only one of the eleven who lasted in the League beyond 1952, making All-Pro for the Baltimore Colts in 1953 before he retired in 1955. Of the remaining ten players, four did not last beyond the Texans' only season, and six never played another down of professional football.

== Season-by-season ==
Year	W	L	T	Finish	Coach
1952	1	11	0	6th National	Jim Phelan
