= Caterair =

- Company type: Privately held company
- Industry: Airline
- Predecessor: Marriott Corporation
- Founded: July 1989
- Founder: Group of investors including Daniel J. Altobello and Frederic V. Malek
- Defunct: 1995
- Fate: Bankruptcy
- Successor: LSG Sky Chefs
- Headquarters: Rockville, Maryland, United States
- Area served: Texas and Worldwide
- Products: Airline meals
- Owner: Carlyle Group
- Number of employees: 20,000 peak (1991)

Caterair was an American company that provided in-flight meals for passengers on large commuter aircraft. The company was based in Texas but headquartered in Rockville, Maryland.

It is famous for its association with George W. Bush, who was a member of its board of directors between 1990 and 1994, and even served on its audit committee. He quit the Board to run for the position of Texas governor, months before the firm declared bankruptcy.

The company was a Texas-based investment of the private equity firm Carlyle Group. The company failed in 1994 and the remains of the business was sold in 1995 and merged by its new owner with LSG Sky Chefs.

== History ==
In 1989, a Group of Marriot's upper management together with Carlyle acquired the business from Marriott Corporation which sold its In-Flite Services catering business. Carlyle took a 50% stake, committing $93.8 million. The business was renamed Caterair and the investment was funded primarily by a massive issuance of junk bond financing, as was the trend at that time.

By 1991, the company had contracts with 48 air carriers in 28 cities include Virgin Atlantic at Boston’s Logan, All Nippon at JFK in New York, and Aerolineas Argentinas at Miami’s airport.

With the global economy spiralling into recession during the early 1990s, the airline business faltered, and with it did Caterair. It eventually defaulted on its debt obligations during 1994. Hence, it was later dubbed CraterAir, by Wall Street analysts.

Caterair was sold by Carlyle to the Canadian private equity firm, Onex Corporation, in September 1995 which merged it with its other acquisition LSG/Sky Chef.

== Quotes ==
David Rubenstein (a founder of the Carlyle Group) described that time to a convention of pension managers in Los Angeles last year, recalling that Republican fund raiser, Fred Malek approached him and said:

"There is a guy who would like to be on the board. He's kind of down on his luck a bit. Needs a job. . . . Needs some board positions." Though Rubenstein didn't think George W. Bush, then in his mid-40s, "added much value," he put him on the Caterair board. "Came to all the meetings," Rubenstein told the conventioneers. "Told a lot of jokes. Not that many clean ones. And after a while I kind of said to him, after about three years: You know, I'm not sure this is really for you. Maybe you should do something else. Because I don't think you're adding that much value to the board. You don't know that much about the company." He said: "Well, I think I'm getting out of this business anyway. And I don't really like it that much. So I'm probably going to resign from the board." And I said "thanks". Didn't think I'd ever see him again.

— David Rubenstein, The New York Times Ron Suskind, Without A Doubt, 17 October 2004
