= Chicken George (restaurant chain) =

Restaurant chain based in Baltimore, Maryland, US

- Type: Privately held company
- Industry: Restaurant chain and franchise
- Founded: November 1979; 46 years ago in Baltimore, Maryland
- Founder: Theodore Holmes
- Defunct: September 1991; 35 years ago
- Fate: Dissolved due to bankruptcy
- Area served: Atlanta, Georgia; Baltimore, Maryland; Los Angeles, California; Philadelphia, Pennsylvania; Washington, D.C.; Additional U.S. states
- Products: Fast food
- Owner: Joloj Industries, Inc. (1979–1987); George, Hill & Sons Management (1987–1989); Meldon S. Hollis Jr. (1989–1991)

Chicken George was a fast food restaurant chain based in Baltimore, Maryland. The first restaurant was established by Theodore Holmes in November 1979 in the Mondawmin Mall in Baltimore. The company later expanded to a total of six restaurants in Baltimore, and also branched out to Philadelphia, Pennsylvania, and Washington, D.C. Franchise restaurants were also existent in Atlanta, Los Angeles and in other cities. In September 1991, the company filed for bankruptcy to be dissolved.

== Company overview ==
=== Beginnings ===
The restaurants were owned by Joloj Industries, Inc., which was founded by Theodore Holmes. The company's name was chosen based upon a character name in the book Roots: The Saga of an American Family. At its prime, the company had six restaurants in Baltimore, two in Philadelphia, Pennsylvania and a location in Washington D.C., along with franchise restaurants. The chain was very popular in Baltimore, having been described as "that it seemingly became a household name overnight" by the Baltimore Afro-American newspaper. In August 1980, the company was described by the Baltimore Afro-American as "the highest grossing single chicken outlet in the country" (per the advisement of Theodore Holmes to the newspaper). In 1982, the company earned sales revenue of US$14 million.

=== Franchises ===
The company had franchises in Atlanta, Los Angeles and in other states. It was reported in January 1983 that the company had plans to expand in Oklahoma, with a franchise agreement having been signed.

=== Ownership ===
In January 1987, the company and the rights to the company's concept was purchased by George, Hill & Sons Management. In January 1989, the company was purchased by Meldon S. Hollis Jr.! in September 1991, the company filed to dissolve the business in Chapter 7 bankruptcy proceedings.

== Products ==
Theodore Holmes spent $750,000 developing the company's chicken products, utilizing personal taste testing by himself and staff members. Fare included chicken, chicken salad, gumbo, fish and chips and various side dishes, such as greens, biscuits, french fries and rice. The company opted to not serve pork products, and used beef to flavor its various products.

== Theodore Holmes ==
Theodore Holmes was the founder and chief executive officer of Chicken George restaurants. In September 1991, it was reported by The Baltimore Sun that Chicken George became the "largest black-owned fast-food company in the country" after its creation. Holmes died on November 29, 2011, at the age of 72, from complications due to diabetes.

== Restaurants of the same name overseas ==
There is an unrelated company in England that operates restaurants named Chicken George in Round Green, Luton, England, and in Sudbury, Suffolk, England. As well as another in Sydney, Australia, operating takeaway fried chicken/butchers in the suburbs; Randwick, Burwood, Marrickville and Sylvania.

== See also ==
- Ameche's Drive-in – a former fast-food restaurant chain based in Baltimore, Maryland
- Gino's Hamburgers – a former fast-food restaurant chain founded in Baltimore, Maryland
- List of defunct fast-food restaurant chains
- List of fast-food chicken restaurants
