= Pat & Oscar's =

Restaurant in Temecula, California, US

- Formerly: Oscar's
- Type: Private
- Industry: Restaurants
- Founded: 1991 in San Diego, California, U.S.
- Headquarters: Carlsbad, California
- Number of locations: 1
- Products: Breadsticks, pizza, chicken, ribs, sandwiches
- Website: www.breadstick.com

Pat & Oscar's, formerly known as Oscar's, is a restaurant with one location in Temecula, California, United States. The first location was opened in 1991.

== History ==
Oscar's was founded by husband-and-wife team Oscar and Pat Sarkisian in 1991. The first location opened in Carmel Mountain Ranch, San Diego.

In May 2000, Sizzler International announced it would purchase an 82% stake in the Oscar's chain for $21 million in cash and stock. It would also provide up to $9.5 million in financing to help the chain expand.

In 2001, the restaurant was renamed from "Oscar's" to "Pat & Oscar's" to avoid trademark conflicts during expansion. Public marketing suggested that the reason was to give credit to Pat, who also contributed to the business.

In 2009, the management team of Pat & Oscar's bought out the company.

In 2011, the company filed for bankruptcy. That same year, the original family reopened the Temecula, CA location. The restaurant is still operating under the name of Pat & Oscar's, but is owned by a completely separate company than the previous corporation of Pat & Oscar's.

In May 2012, after most of the restaurants closed, the remaining franchisees merged under a new brand, "O's American Kitchen", with ten locations.

In 2019, the final Pat & Oscar's restaurant closed.

In 2020, the Pat & Oscar's family planned to embark on a new concept. Under the same ownership, the final Pat & Oscar's, in Temecula, was refitted as a brewpub. Oscar's Brewing Company was set to open in June 2020.

Oscars Brewing Company, owned by Pat & Oscar's co-owner Oscar Sarkisian, opened in the former Pat & Oscar's location in June 2020. In June 2021, Oscar's Brewing Company celebrated its first anniversary.

== Community involvement ==
Pat & Oscar's valued community involvement since its inception. In 2008, they raised an estimated $15,000 for the Make-a-Wish Foundation.
