= Kayford, West Virginia =

- Unincorporated community
- Location within West Virginia Location within the United States
- Coordinates: 38°00′56″N 81°27′07″W
- Country: United States
- State: West Virginia
- County: Kanawha
- Elevation: 1,260 ft (380 m)
- Time zone: UTC-5 (Eastern (EST))
  - Summer (DST): UTC-4 (EDT)
- ZIP codes: 25116
- Area codes: 304 & 681
- GNIS feature ID: 1541090

Kayford is an unincorporated community in Kanawha County, West Virginia, United States. Kayford is 6 miles (9.7 km) east of Sylvester.

Doris Fields, Blues singer who performs as Lady D, grew up in Kayford.

== See also ==
- Slab Fork, West Virginia
