= Alan Ameche =

American football player (1933–1988)

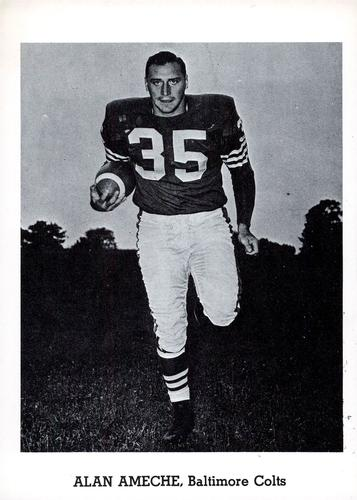
- Ameche c. 1960

No. 35
- Position: Fullback

Personal information
- Born: June 1, 1933; Kenosha, Wisconsin, U.S.
- Died: August 8, 1988 (aged 55); Houston, Texas, U.S.
- Listed height: 6 ft 0 in (1.83 m)
- Listed weight: 218 lb (99 kg)

Career information
- High school: Bradford (Kenosha)
- College: Wisconsin (1951–1954)
- NFL draft: 1955: 1st round, 3rd overall pick

Career history
- Baltimore Colts (1955–1960)

Awards and highlights
- 2× NFL champion (1958, 1959); NFL Rookie of the Year (1955); First-team All-Pro (1955); 3× Second-team All-Pro (1956, 1958, 1959); 4× Pro Bowl (1955–1958); NFL rushing yards leader (1955); NFL rushing touchdowns leader (1955); NFL 1950s All-Decade Team; Heisman Trophy (1954); UPI Player of the Year (1954); Unanimous All-American (1954); First-team All-American (1953); Chicago Tribune Silver Football (1954); 3× First-team All-Big Ten (1952–1954); Wisconsin Badgers No. 35 retired

Career NFL statistics
- Rushing yards: 4,045
- Rushing average: 4.2
- Rushing touchdowns: 40
- Receptions: 101
- Receiving yards: 733
- Receiving touchdowns: 4
- Stats at Pro Football Reference
- College Football Hall of Fame

Alan Ameche (/əˈmiːtʃi/; June 1, 1933 – August 8, 1988), nicknamed "the Iron Horse", or simply "the Horse", was an American professional football player who was a fullback for six seasons with the Baltimore Colts in the National Football League (NFL). He played college football for the Wisconsin Badgers and won the Heisman Trophy during his senior season in 1954. He was elected to the Pro Bowl in each of his first four seasons in the league. He is often remembered for scoring the winning touchdown in overtime in the 1958 NFL Championship Game against the New York Giants, labeled "The Greatest Game Ever Played".

With colleague and former Colts teammate Gino Marchetti, Ameche founded the Gino's Hamburgers chain. He also founded the Baltimore-based Ameche's Drive-in restaurants.

== Early life ==
Ameche was born in Kenosha, Wisconsin, as Lino Dante Amici to Italian immigrant parents who came to the United States in the late 1920s, although they returned for a year to Italy during his childhood. The family then returned to Kenosha, where he attended Bradford High School. Ameche was a cousin of actor brothers Don and Jim Ameche.

== College career ==
Ameche earned unanimous All-America honors at the University of Wisconsin–Madison, where he played linebacker as well as fullback in single-platoon days. In four years as a Badger, he gained 3,212 yards, then the NCAA record, scored 25 touchdowns, and averaged 4.8 yards per carry. He played in the program's first bowl game, the 1953 Rose Bowl, as a sophomore, rushing for 133 yards on 28 carries. Ameche won the Heisman Trophy in 1954, the first for the Badger program.

Ameche is one of six Wisconsin football players to have a number retired by the program (35) and enshrined on the Camp Randall Stadium façade as of 2008: fellow Heisman winner and current career rushing record holder Ron Dayne (33), Elroy Hirsch (40), Dave Schreiner (80), Allan Schafer (83), and Pat Richter (88) are the others. Ameche was inducted into the Wisconsin Athletic Hall of Fame in 1967, the College Football Hall of Fame in 1975, and the Rose Bowl Hall of Fame in 2004.

== NFL career ==
Ameche was the third overall selection of the 1955 NFL draft. He played fullback for the Baltimore Colts from 1955 until 1960. Named NFL Rookie of the Year in 1955, he was a four-time Pro Bowler (1955–58), and the only rookie named to the Associated Press All-Pro team in 1955. Ameche averaged 4.2 yards per carry over his career, and held the record for most rushing yards in his first three NFL games (410) until Carnell "Cadillac" Williams broke the record by gaining 434 yards in 2005.

Ameche may be best remembered for his role in the 1958 NFL Championship Game at Yankee Stadium, often cited as "The Greatest Game Ever Played." Ameche scored the winning touchdown for the Colts on a one-yard run with 6:45 left in overtime as the Colts beat the Giants, 23–17. It was his second touchdown of the day. He also scored a touchdown on a 2-yard run in the second quarter. His overtime touchdown was the last in championship history until Super Bowl LI in February 2017, when James White scored at 3:58 of overtime as the New England Patriots beat the Atlanta Falcons, 34–28.

Due to an Achilles tendon injury in December 1960, Ameche finished a relatively short six-season NFL career with 4,045 rushing yards, 101 receptions for 733 yards and 44 touchdowns. He is one of only four players named to the National Football League 1950s All-Decade Team not elected to the Pro Football Hall of Fame. The others are Joe Fortunato, Dick Barwegen and Bobby Walston. In 2015, the Professional Football Researchers Association named Ameche to the P.F.R.A. "Hall of Very Good" Class of 2015.

== NFL career statistics ==
Legend
	Won NFL Championship
	Led the league
**Bold**	Career high

Year	Team	Games		Rushing						Receiving					Fumbles	
Year	Team	GP	GS	Att	Yds	Avg	Y/G	Lng	TD	Rec	Yds	Avg	Lng	TD	Fum	FR
1955	BAL	12	12	**213**	**961**	4.5	**80.1**	**79**	**9**	**27**	141	5.2	18	0	**3**	**1**
1956	BAL	12	12	178	858	**4.8**	71.5	43	8	26	**189**	7.3	22	0	**3**	0
1957	BAL	12	12	144	493	3.4	41.1	49	5	15	137	**9.1**	**40**	**2**	**3**	0
1958	BAL	12	12	171	791	4.6	65.9	28	8	13	81	6.2	18	1	1	0
1959	BAL	12	11	178	679	3.8	56.6	26	7	13	129	9.9	30	1	**3**	0
1960	BAL	10	7	80	263	3.3	26.3	16	3	7	56	8.0	19	0	0	0
Career		70	66	964	4,045	4.2	57.8	79	40	101	733	7.3	40	4	13	1

== Business career ==
Ameche's Drive-in was a fast-food restaurant chain based in Baltimore, founded by Alan Ameche. Ameche's had five locations, all located in Baltimore or its suburbs:

- Governor Ritchie Highway and 5th Avenue, Glen Burnie
- 5800 Reisterstown Road, Baltimore City
- Loch Raven Boulevard and Taylor Avenue
- 7700 Wise Avenue, Dundalk
- York Road and Timonium Road, Timonium

The restaurants were known for "no charge" carry out service, signature "Powerhouse" hamburgers ("A banquet on a bun"), akin to today's Big Mac or Whopper sandwiches, and "Cheerleader" sandwiches (hot ham and Swiss cheese with mustard) and their onion rings. The Loch Raven and Taylor location was open during the Summer of 1960. There is a McDonald's on the location today. The restaurants were typical drive-ins, with car side order boxes. Orders were delivered by a carhop who attached a tray to the lowered window. The company trademark was a Big Boy-like football player (#35) running through the uprights carrying a hamburger. In addition, Ameche's secret sauce was sold in many local grocery stores. The company slogan was "Meetcha at Ameche's!" Ameche's restaurants were informally known by many teenaged patrons as "UM-cheez."

== Death ==
Ameche had undergone triple bypass surgery at age 46 in 1979. He died of a heart attack in 1988 at age 55 at Methodist Hospital in Houston, Texas, a few days after undergoing another heart bypass surgery, under the care of Dr. Michael DeBakey. He is interred at Calvary Cemetery in West Conshohocken, Pennsylvania.

== Personal life ==
Ameche's widow, Yvonne, later married Glenn Davis. Both of her husbands had won a Heisman Trophy and played in the NFL.

== See also ==
- Chicken George – a former fast food restaurant chain based in Baltimore, Maryland
- Gino's Hamburgers – A local Baltimore establishment co-founded by Alan Ameche with Gino Marchetti.
- List of fast food restaurants
- List of defunct fast-food restaurant chains
