= Gino's Hamburgers =

Fast food chain originating in Baltimore, Maryland, US

Gino's Burgers and Chicken
- Formerly: Gino's Hamburgers
- Industry: Fast food
- Founded: 1957; 69 years ago in Dundalk, Maryland, as Gino's Hamburgers
- Defunct: 1982; 44 years ago (revived in 2010 as Gino's Burgers and Chicken)
- Fate: Acquisition by Marriott Corporation
- Headquarters: King of Prussia, Pennsylvania
- Number of locations: 2
- Area served: Maryland
- Key people: Gino Marchetti (chain's namesake), Karen Foreman, CEO
- Products: Fast food (including hamburgers, French fries, and fried chicken)
- Website: ginosgiant.com

Gino's Hamburgers was a fast-food restaurant chain founded in Baltimore, Maryland, by Baltimore Colts defensive end Gino Marchetti and running back Alan Ameche, along with their close friends Joe Campanella, who played linebacker for six seasons for the Cleveland Browns and the Baltimore Colts and Louis Fischer, in 1957. A new group of restaurants under the Gino's name, involving some of the principals of the original chain, was started in 2010. Campanella left the group in 1963 and started his own restaurant, Rustler Steak House.

== History ==
The first Gino's was opened in Dundalk, Maryland, just outside Baltimore; it got its official name in 1959 when the owners Joe Campanella, Louis Fischer, and Alan Ameche invited Colts' captain Gino Marchetti to become a partner. In 1967 Gino's merged with Tops Drive Inn, a chain of 18 drive-in restaurants located in the Washington, D.C., area; most Tops locations were rebranded as Gino's. In the early 1970s, the company attempted to expand from its Mid-Atlantic base into the Midwest; however, these locations only operated for a short period. For one location, it purchased Orchestra Hall in Detroit and planned to demolish the structure to construct a restaurant. When the plan became public, it led to a grass-roots campaign to save and restore the abandoned structure.

Gino's also expanded in to Massachusetts and Connecticut. There it had difficulties because Gino Marchetti was a relative unknown in the region. Additionally, people confused them with the Papa Gino's pizza chain that was based in Massachusetts. These locations were eventually closed and many now house other chains, especially Burger King. Gino's also converted some to fish restaurants, but these too failed.

Another notable facet of Gino's was fried chicken. In the mid-Atlantic area, it was the franchisee of KFC which was co-branded with Gino's hamburgers. In New England, another company was the KFC franchisee. Gino's still sold chicken but it was made with a different seasoning from the KFC one.

The chain had 359 company-owned locations when the Marriott Corporation acquired it in 1982. Marriott discontinued the brand and converted locations to its Roy Rogers Restaurants chain. The last Gino's, located in Pasadena, Maryland and owned independently from Marriott, closed in 1986.

Gino's also purchased and operated the Rustler Steak House chain started by Joe Campanella, which was sold by Marriott shortly after its purchase of Gino's.

The restaurant was known for hamburgers such as the Sirloiner, which was made from sirloin steak (and was originally a staple of Tops Drive Inn), the Jumbo Gino, which was very similar to the Whopper and the Gino Giant, which predated and later competed with the Big Mac. The company held the franchise for Kentucky Fried Chicken in the Mid-Atlantic states. The company's jingle, played during radio advertisements in the early years was "Everybody goes to Gino's, 'cause Gino's is the place to go!". Gino's also had an expansive salad bar and roast beef sandwiches.

The company also became known for its philanthropic efforts.

== Gino's Burgers and Chicken (2010) ==
Marchetti, Romano, and Fischer have opened several new Gino's restaurants. Marchetti and Fischer will be serving as consultants. The new restaurants plan to serve burgers, chicken sandwiches, hand-cut french fries and hand-spun milkshakes. Initially, the chain plans to open locations in Pennsylvania and Maryland.

In charge is Tom Romano, who worked for 20 years with the company, and was C.O.O. in 1982 when the chain was sold. "It's apparent there's a need for better burgers out there", said Romano, citing the success of such chains as Five Guys, and Gino's Burgers and Chicken has placed itself upscale of the earlier Gino's. Gino's plans to make its burgers to order from fresh beef.

Their first location opened in King of Prussia, Pennsylvania, the same town as the original chain's headquarters, on October 25, 2010. Plans were announced in Spring 2011 for franchise expansion into Baltimore. On August 17, 2011, a second Gino's location opened in Towson, Maryland. Another Gino's opened in Bensalem, Pennsylvania on October 11, 2011.

A Gino's Burgers and Chicken opened in Oriole Park at Camden Yards at the start of the Orioles season in 2012, but closed by the end of the 2014 season.

On January 22, 2013, Gino's Burgers and Chicken opened in Aberdeen, Maryland, however the Bensalem location closed around the same time. Later, on July 9, 2013, the King of Prussia location closed, effectively leaving the Philadelphia market. The location at Perry Hall, Maryland, which opened on March 5, 2012, closed on December 8, 2013. The Aberdeen location closed on March 27, 2016, leaving only the Towson and Glen Burnie locations.

== See also ==
- Ameche's Drive-in – a former fast-food restaurant chain based in Baltimore, Maryland
- Chicken George – a former fast food restaurant chain founded in Baltimore, Maryland
- List of defunct fast-food restaurant chains
- List of hamburger restaurants
