= Marriott Corporation =

Previous forms of the hospitality company in Bethesda, Maryland, United States

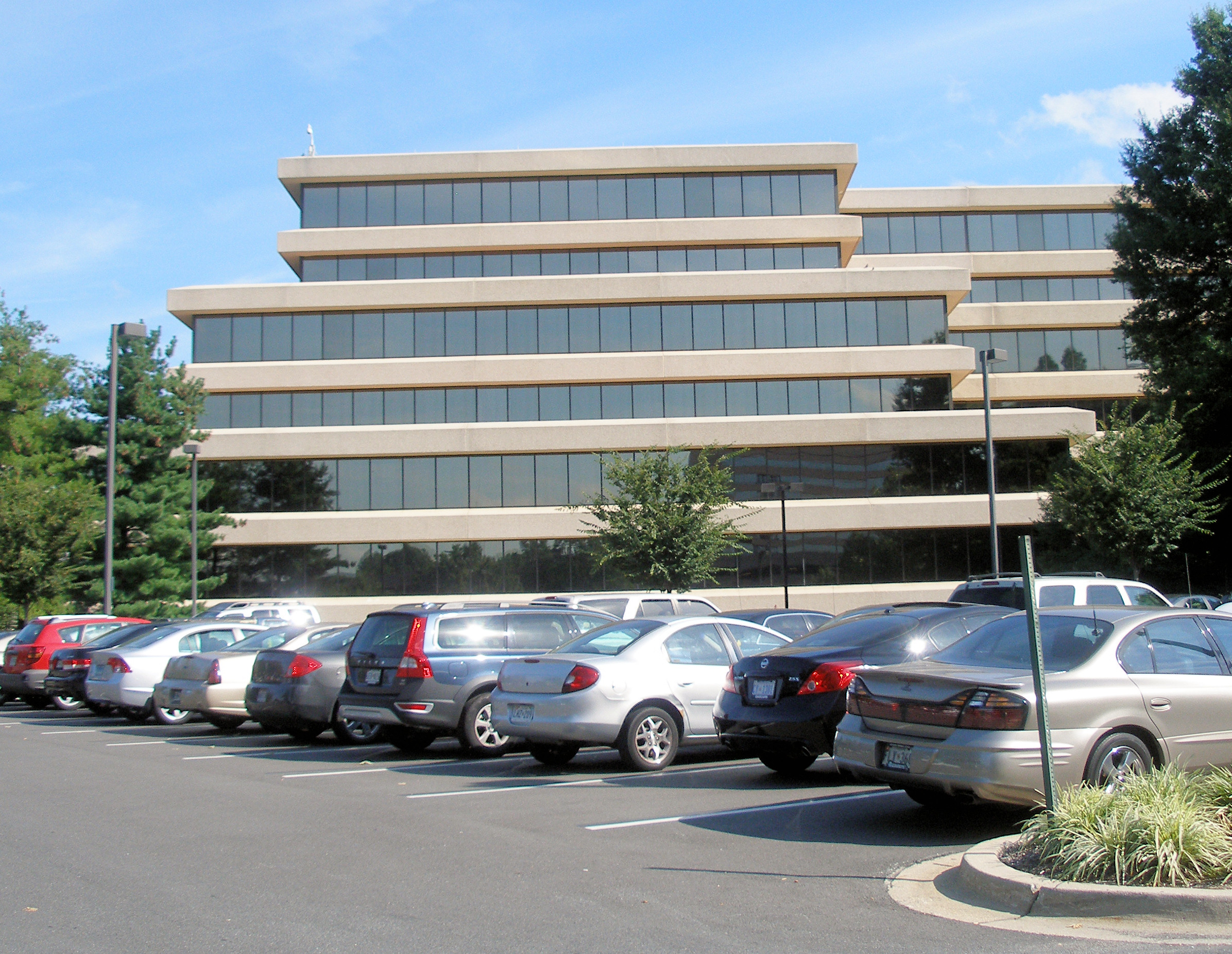
- Former Marriott headquarters in Bethesda, Maryland (demolished in 2023)
- Formerly: The Hot Shoppe (1927–1929); Hot Shoppes, Inc. (1929–1964); Marriott-Hot Shoppes, Inc. (1964–1967)
- Type: Public
- Traded as: NYSE: MHS
- Industry: Hospitality
- Founded: 1927 as The Hot Shoppe in Washington, D.C., U.S. Incorporated in 1929 as Hot Shoppes, Inc. in Wilmington, Delaware, U.S.
- Defunct: 1993; 33 years ago
- Fate: Corporate split
- Successors: Marriott International; Host Marriott Corporation
- Headquarters: Bethesda, Maryland, U.S.
- Area served: Worldwide
- Key people: Bill Marriott (chairman, CEO and president) at time of corporate split
- Services: Hotels, resorts, restaurants, food service
- Total assets: $9.1 billion (1992)
- Owner: Marriott family (25%)

The Marriott Corporation was an American hospitality company that operated from 1927 until 1993. It was founded as The Hot Shoppe and subsequently incorporated as Hot Shoppes, Inc. The company opened its first hotel in 1957, the Marriott Motor Hotel in Arlington County, Virginia (demolished in 1990). The company's first international property was opened in 1969 in Acapulco, Mexico. Hot Shoppes became the Marriott Corporation in 1967, which later split into Marriott International and Host Marriott Corporation in 1993.

== History ==
J. Willard Marriott, who had moved away with his wife Alice and his business partner Hugh Colton in 1927 from Utah to Washington, D.C., operated a curbside stand selling A&W Root Beer in the Columbia Heights neighborhood of Washington at 14th Street and Park Road NW. The root beer stand was soon renamed as The Hot Shoppe after adding Mexican food items to the menu. In 1934, Marriott's business expanded to Baltimore, Maryland, and later to Philadelphia, Pennsylvania shortly after which the company started its food services division. During the Second World War, the business expanded to include the management of food services in defense plants and government buildings, such as the U.S. Treasury.

They introduced popular items such as the "Mighty Mo", a double hamburger served in a bun, topped with sesame seeds and divided into three slices. It was stacked with a dill pickle strip in the top layer and tomato, lettuce, and a distinctive dressing on the bottom layer. Very thick milk shakes were served with a long-handled spoon and an unusually wide straw, both of which would stand upright by themselves in the thick drinks. Similarly thick orange sherbet drinks were served in the same tall glass with a spoon and a straw, often called a "freeze". These would become mainstays of the luncheon menu and be imitated forever thereafter.

During the 1950s, Hot Shoppes, Inc. started providing food services to public schools and to Children's National Medical Center in 1955, a contract which they held for 35 years.

The company went public in 1953.

In 1957, the firm expanded into the hotel industry by opening the first Marriott hotel, the Marriott Motor Hotel, in Arlington County, Virginia.

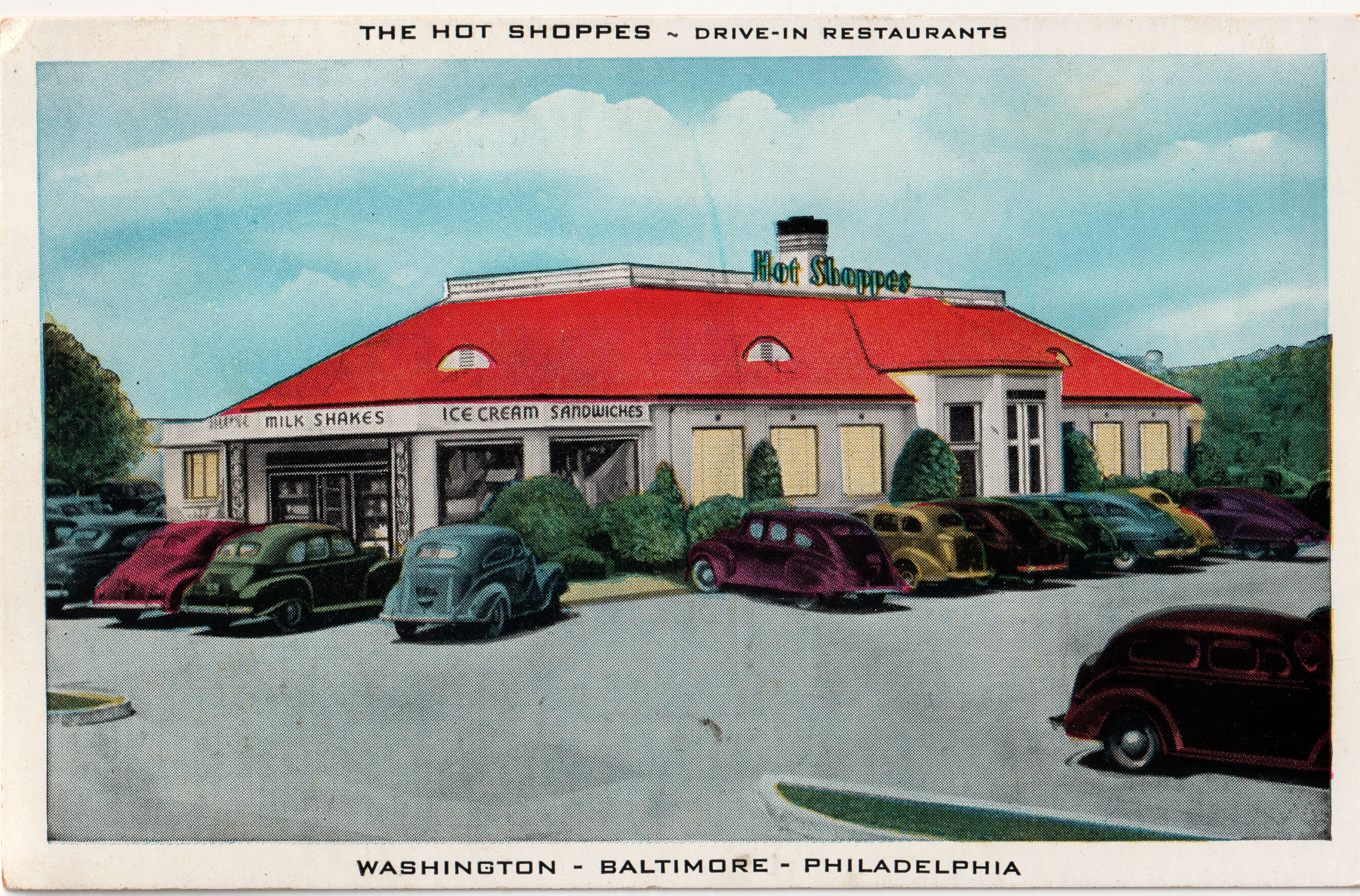
The Hot Shoppes drive-in restaurant promotional postcard

In 1964, Hot Shoppes, Inc. was renamed Marriott-Hot Shoppes, Inc. The company became Marriott Corporation in 1967.

In 1967, Marriott acquired the Big Boy family restaurants chain from Bob Wian.

The following year, Marriott acquired the Fort Wayne-based RoBee's, a roast beef sandwich fast-food chain, but later discovered that they would not be able to use the RoBee's name nationally. At the suggestion of the new Marriott board member Bob Wian, cowboy actor Roy Rogers was contacted to lend his name to the roast beef sandwich venture, and the Roy Rogers Family Restaurants was formed a few months later by converting RoBee's and a few Hot Shoppe locations.

Over the years, Marriott's company interests expanded. Continuing with food services, Marriott became involved with airline in-flight food service through its Marriott In-Flite Services division, which by the late 1980s was the world's largest provider of airline meals, serving roughly 150 airlines and generating about $800 million in revenue in 1988. In July 1989, Marriott sold the division to a management-led investor group (Caterair International, led by Daniel J. Altobello and Frederic V. Malek) for an estimated $550-650 million. Marriott retained only a minor equity stake and one board seat; the business was later renamed Caterair and eventually failed.

In 1976, Marriott opened two theme parks named Marriott's Great America in California and Illinois. Another was planned for in Maryland but local opposition prevented construction from ever beginning at any of the three proposed sites. Marriott had also reached an agreement to acquire Cedar Point amusement park in Ohio, but the deal was later called off. The theme parks had replicas of the first Hot Shoppes. Both parks were sold in the mid-1980s, the one in California was sold to the city of Santa Clara, California and the one in Illinois was sold to Six Flags in 1984. They were both later renamed California's Great America and Six Flags Great America, respectively.

In 1982, the company acquired Host International for $120 million and also Gino's Inc., the owner of Gino's Hamburgers and Rustler Steak House restaurant chains, for $48.6 million. 108 Rustler Steak House Restaurants plus three other restaurants were sold in the following year to two different firms for undisclosed amounts. Newly formed Tenly Enterprises purchased 94 restaurants while Sizzler Restaurants International purchased the remaining 17.

By 1984, Marriott had entered the vacation ownership (timeshare) business through the acquisition of American Resorts Club (later the foundation of Marriott Vacation Club International) and had also formed a Senior Living Services division.

In 1985, the company purchased the Howard Johnson's restaurant chain from the Imperial Group P.L.C. of London for $314 million with plans of converting the acquired restaurants to the Bob's Big Boy brand and to make Bob's the largest coffee-shop business in the country.

In 1987, Marriott sold the Big Boy restaurants franchise rights to Elias Brothers for an undisclosed amount while keeping 208 company-owned Bob's Big Boy restaurants in California and selected locations on the East Coast.

In 1988, Marriott purchased all 91 Wag's restaurants from Walgreens Corporation, but dissolved the chain in 1991.

The Roy Rogers chain was sold to Hardee's in 1990 for $365 million in cash.

The Marriott Corporation ended its existence as a single company in 1993, when it was split into two separate entities: 1) Marriott International Corporation, which operated the hotel and lodging aspect of the business and Marriott Vacation Club International, and 2) Host Marriott Corporation, the new name for the original Marriott Corporation and operating the Marriott Food Services Management. The last Hot Shoppes restaurant, located in the Marlow Heights Shopping Center, closed on December 2, 1999.

== See also ==
- Big Boy Restaurants
- Farrell's Ice Cream Parlour
- Gino's Hamburgers
- Roy Rogers Restaurants
- Rustler Steak House
