= Collins Foods =

Australian restaurant operation company

- Formerly: Collins Foods International (1968–1991); Sizzler International (1991–2001); Worldwide Restaurant Concepts (2001–2005)
- Type: Public
- Traded as: ASX: CKF; S&P/ASX 300 Component
- Industry: Consumer Services; Restaurants; Franchisee
- Founded: 13 August 1968; 58 years ago in Culver City, California, U.S. as Collins Foods International
- Founder: James A. Collins
- Headquarters: Level 3, KSD1, 485 Kingsford Smith Drive, Hamilton, Queensland, Australia
- Number of locations: 275 KFC restaurants in Australia, 16 in Germany, 56 in the Netherlands and 27 Taco Bell restaurants in Australia (As of October 2023)
- Area served: Australia; Germany; Netherlands
- Key people: Xavier Simonet (CEO)
- Revenue: ▲AU$574.3 million (2016); AU$571.6 million (2015)
- Operating income: ▲AU$52.4 million (2016)
- Net income: ▲ A$30.1 million (2016)
- Total assets: ▲AU$428.3 million (May 2016); AU$408.9 million (May 2015)
- Total equity: ▲AU$189.7 million (May 2016); AU$171.3 million (May 2015)
- Number of employees: 9181 (Sep 2016)
- Subsidiaries: Collins Foods Germany Ltd; Collins Foods Netherlands Ltd
- Website: www.collinsfg.com.au

Collins Foods Limited is a publicly-listed Australian company focused on restaurant operations. It operates KFC and Taco Bell restaurants in Australia, Germany, and the Netherlands. It owned the US-based Sizzler restaurants until 2011, operated Sizzler in Australia until 2020, and franchised Sizzler in Asia. It also operated Snag Stand in Australia until 2017, and was the majority owner of Pat & Oscar's in the US until 2009.

== History ==
Having acquired the Sizzler brand in 1967, United States national, James Collins, founded Collins Foods International in Culver City, California in 1968, after a number of meetings with Colonel Sanders. At its height, Collins Foods International was a publicly traded American company with more than 240 Sizzler and KFC stores in the United States and Australia.

Collins Foods International began selling off 209 United States–based KFC stores to PepsiCo in 1990. The sale was completed in 1991 for a total of US$123 million. The company was renamed Sizzler International because its efforts were increasingly focused on its Sizzler business. In 2001, the company was renamed Worldwide Restaurant Concepts.

In 2005, Worldwide Restaurant Concepts was acquired by Australian private equity firm, Pacific Equity Partners (PEP) for about US$208 million in cash. PEP owned 52% of Worldwide Restaurant Concepts with the remaining 48% owned by company management. As a result, the company headquarters moved from California to Brisbane, Australia. After the merger, it was renamed as Collins Foods.

In 2011, Pacific Equity Partners offered its share of Collins Foods to an IPO, ending PEP's ownership of the company.

In July 2020, Drew O'Malley took over as CEO following Graham Maxwell's retirement.

On 1 July 2024, Drew O'Malley stepped down as CEO after being on interim leave since February 2024. Kevin Perkins, former Collins Foods CEO and current non-executive board director, was appointed interim CEO. Xavier Simonet became Collins Foods CEO on 4 November 2024.

== Brands ==
=== KFC ===
As of October 2024, Collins Foods operates 285 KFC restaurants in Australia, 16 in Germany, and 58 in the Netherlands.

==== Australia ====
In November 2013, Collins Foods acquired the 44 KFC restaurants from Competitive Foods Australia for $55.6 million: 40 in Western Australia and four in the Northern Territory. In May 2016, Collins Foods further acquired 13 KFC restaurants in New South Wales and Victoria.

As of November 2016, Collins Foods operated 190 KFC stores in Australia: 132 in Queensland, four in the Northern Territory, 41 in Western Australia, and two in New South Wales. An additional five or six stores were planned for financial year 2017. In June 2017, Collins Foods acquired 28 KFC stores in Tasmania, South Australia and Western Australia from Yum! Brands for $110.2 million.

==== Germany ====
On 31 October 2016, Collins Foods announced that its German subsidiary, Collins Foods Germany, had entered into a binding agreement to acquire 11 KFC restaurants in Stuttgart and Düsseldorf, Germany for €12.7 million (A$18.4 million). That was in the wake of KFC Germany's plans to increase its stores from 140 to 300 in the following few years. In April 2025, Collins Foods said it planned to open 40–70 new KFC outlets in Germany in five years.

==== Netherlands ====
In March 2017, Collins Foods expanded into the Netherlands with the purchase of 16 KFC stores from subsidiaries of Yum! Brands for €62.3 million (A$87.8 million). As part of the deal, Collins Foods also entered into a development agreement to open more than 20 KFC stores in the country by the end of 2021. In May 2023, Collins Foods acquired a further eight KFC restaurants.

=== Former brands ===
==== Taco Bell ====
On 6 September 2018, Collins Foods announced that it has purchased the franchise rights to Taco Bell in Australia. As of April 2025, Collins Foods operates 27 Taco Bell restaurants in Australia. In April 2025, Collins Foods announced it intention to exit the Taco Bell business and transfer its license to a new owner in 12 months or wind the chain up. In March 2026, just weeks from the deadline, Collins Foods successfully transferred the operations to Restaurant Brands, another partner in the area. 6 stores will close in Queensland and 1 in Victoria, leaving 20 in the deal but saving the company from demise and a more exorbitant closure.

==== Sizzler ====
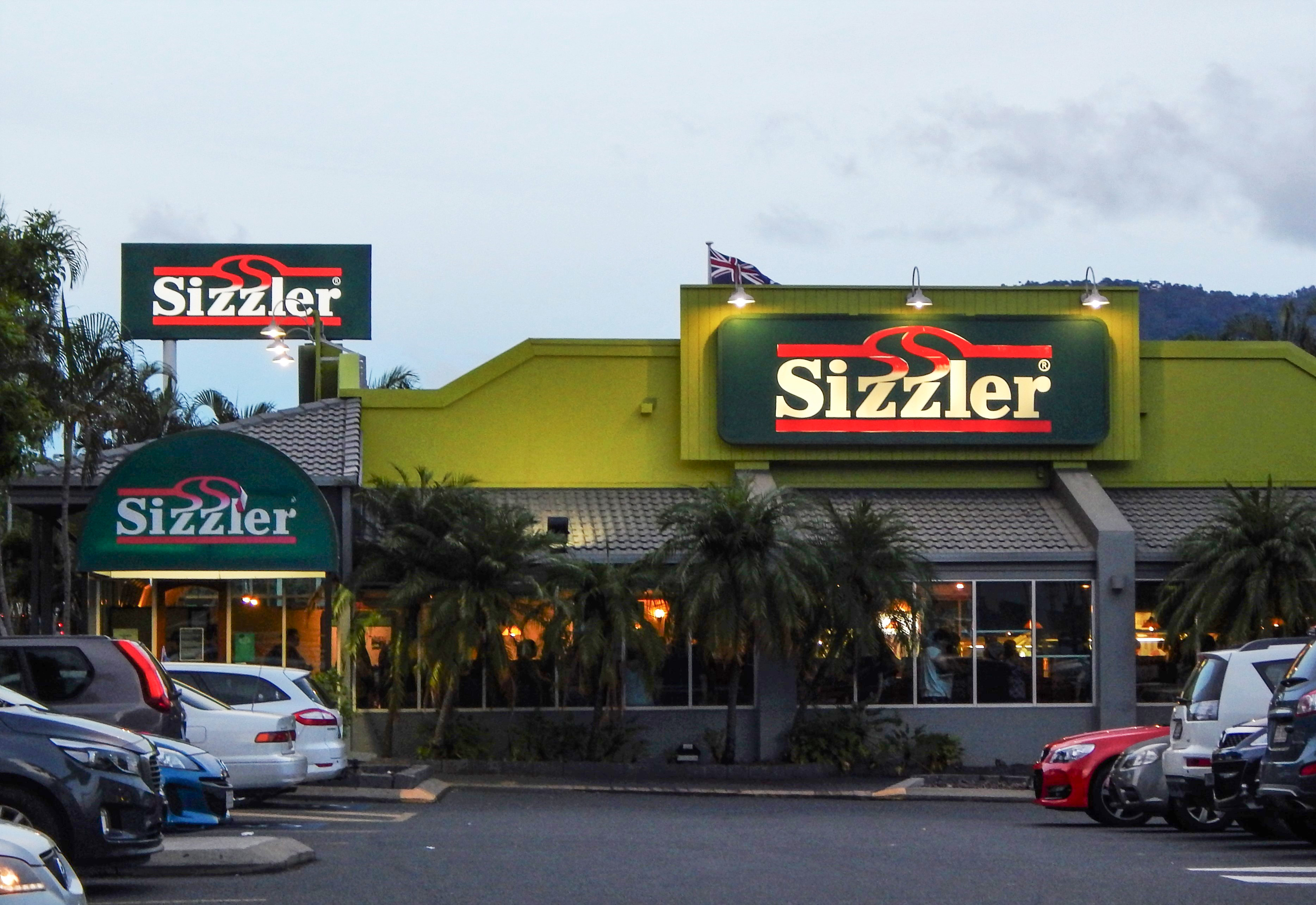
Sizzler in Rockhampton, Queensland just prior to its closure (2020)

In the 1980s, the company's Sizzler business was struggling financially as popularity with the general public dipped. Sizzler appointed Thomas L. Gregory as president and CEO of the chain at the time. The brand underwent changes in menu selection and customer experience, which proved to help bolster the brand's profitability. Based on those results, Collins Foods International expanded further into Asia in 1992.

In the mid-1990s Sizzler International was expanding aggressively in the Pacific region, but domestic sales began to return losses. In 1996, after debts reached approximately US$100 million, the company filed for Chapter 11 bankruptcy protection. After some major restructuring and paying approximately US$70 million to creditors claims, Sizzler International recovered from the bankruptcy.

In 2006, all 28 Sizzler restaurants across Australia temporarily suspended salad bar service after rat poison was found in two Brisbane Sizzler restaurants. Sizzler Australia referred to the incidents as sabotage. The culprit turned out to be a woman described as being mentally unstable.

In February 2008, PEP put Sizzler up for sale. In 2011, Sizzler USA acquired all Sizzler restaurants based in the United States.

In the 2013 financial year, Collins Foods reported stalling revenue for its Sizzler operations in Australia, blaming the downturn of the casual dining sector in the country. In June 2015, Collins Foods wrote down the value of Sizzler by AU$37.5 million. In an investors meeting by Collins Foods, CEO Graham Maxwell states: "We no longer consider Sizzler to be a strategic growth prospect in Australia and therefore we will not be investing further capital". At the time of the fiscal announcement in 2015, Collins had 26 company-owned Sizzler restaurants across Australia and 61 franchised Sizzler restaurants around Asia. Collins Foods began to close a limited number of Sizzler restaurants in Australia, with greater focus directed to their KFC operations. Meanwhile, Sizzler operations in Asia continued to thrive, with further expansion plans in China.

In 2016, Collins Foods operated 21 Sizzler restaurants in Australia, a decrease of two stores compared to the financial year 2016. Collins Foods had operated 65 Sizzler restaurants in Asia during the same year, an increase of five stores compared to the previous financial year. An additional two stores in Asia were planned for the financial year 2017.

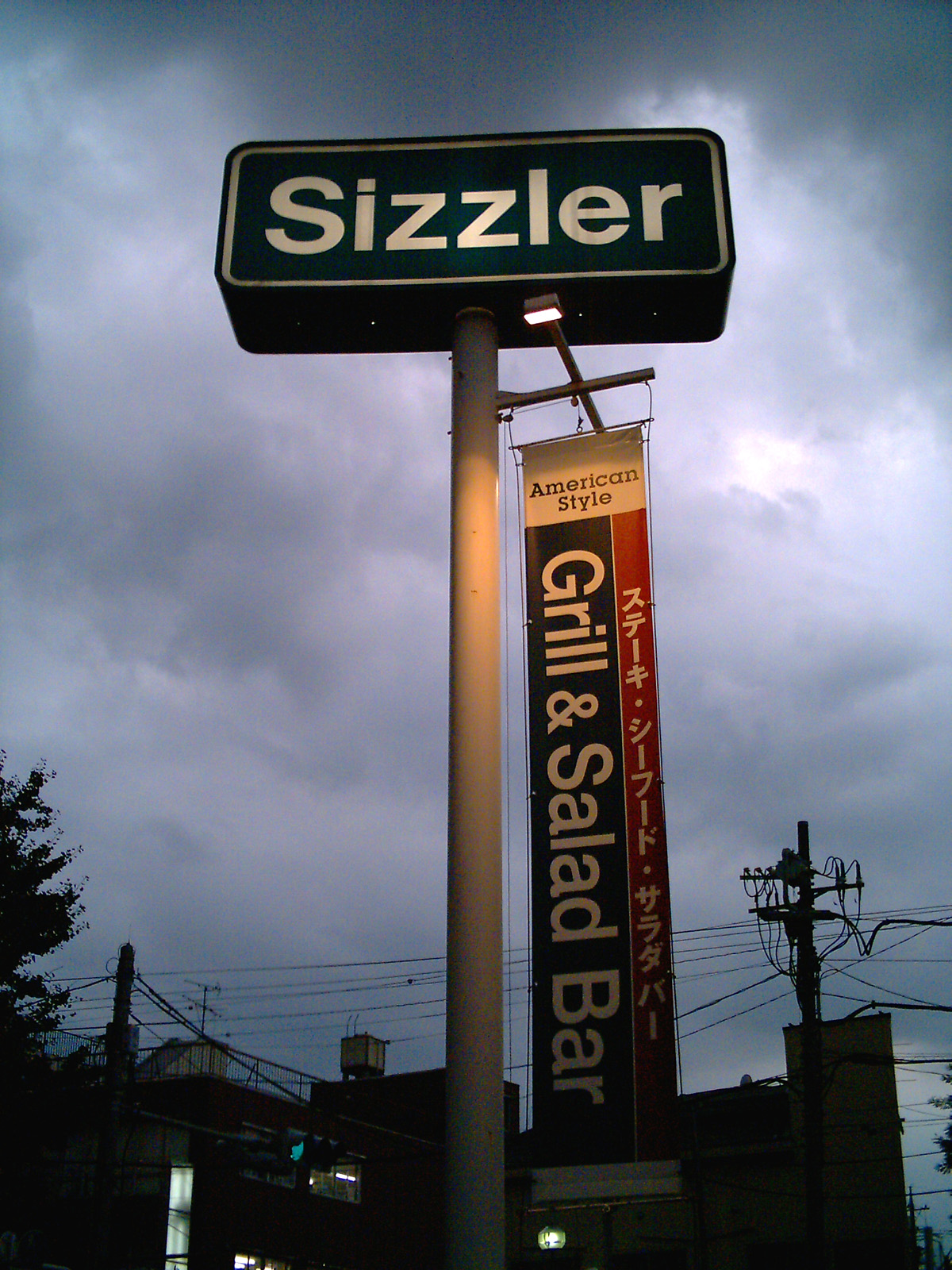
Sizzler in Musashino, Japan (2006)

In 2020, Collins Foods closed its six remaining Sizzler stores in China due to the impact of the COVID-19 pandemic. In October 2020, Collins Foods announced that it would be closing all nine remaining Australian Sizzler restaurants by 15 November 2020, citing the impact of the COVID-19 pandemic on revenues. Collins Foods said of the three restaurant brands that it operates, Sizzler had been hardest hit by the COVID-19 pandemic.

Although Collins had closed all company-owned restaurants in 2020, Collins continued to license the use of the Sizzler restaurant brand for use in Thailand and Japan. In June 2023, it was announced that Collins would sell its Sizzler Asia business to Minor International for S$21 million, ending its relationship with the Sizzler brand.

==== Pat & Oscar's ====
In May 2000, Sizzler International announced it would purchase an 82% stake in the Oscar's restaurant chain for $21 million in cash and stock. The chain was later renamed as Pat & Oscar's. In January 2009, the management team of Pat & Oscar's bought out the company.

==== Snag Stand ====
In 2013, Collins Foods acquired a 50% equity stake in Snag Stand, a gourmet sausage chain founded in 2011 by businessperson Philip Blanco. In 2016, Collins Foods acquired the remaining 50% equity stake in Snag Stand, making the brand a wholly owned property.

Six Snag Stand outlets were operated in Australia: three in Queensland, two in New South Wales, and one in the Australian Capital Territory. Collins Foods closed down all Snag Stand stores in 2017.

== See also ==
- Competitive Foods Australia
- Restaurant Brands
