= Roy Rogers Restaurants =

American fast food restaurant chain

Roy Rogers Franchise Company, LLC

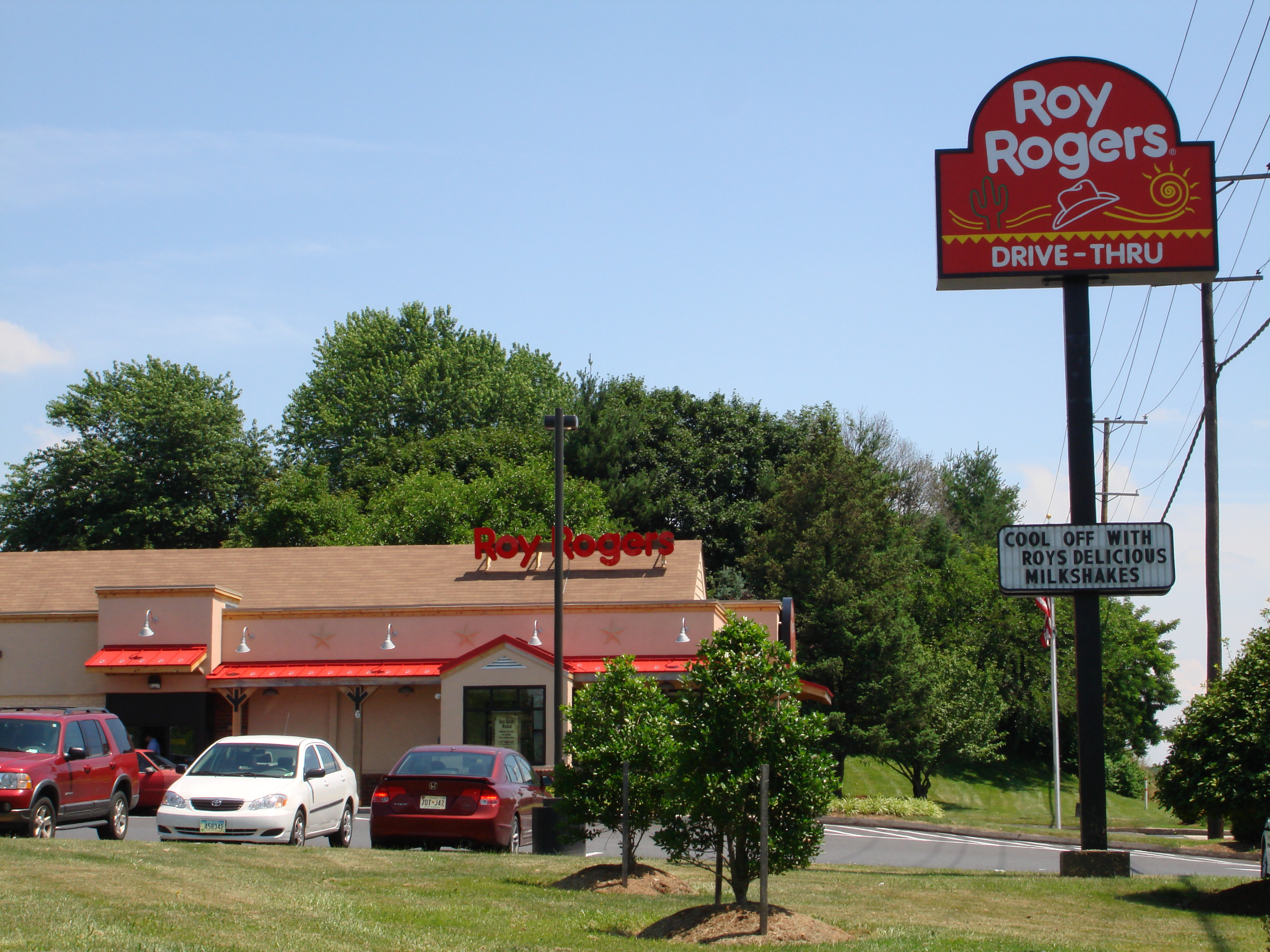
- Roy Rogers Restaurant in Westminster, Maryland, in a former Gino's building, owned by the Plamondon Companies, remodeled in 2018
- Trade name: Roy Rogers Restaurants
- Formerly: RoBee's Roast Beef (1967-1968)
- Type: Subsidiary
- Industry: Restaurants
- Founded: February 12, 1968; 58 years ago, in Fort Wayne, Indiana, U.S.
- Founder: Azar's Big Boy restaurants
- Headquarters: Ballenger Creek, Maryland, U.S.
- Number of locations: 42
- Area served: Maryland, Virginia, Pennsylvania, New Jersey, West Virginia
- Products: Hamburgers; Fried chicken; Roast beef sandwiches; French fries; Soft drinks; Milkshakes; Salads; Desserts; Pancakes; Coffee; Breakfast
- Services: Franchising
- Net income: ▼US$14.8 million (3rd Qtr. 2022)
- Parent: Marriott Corp. (1968–1990); Imasco (1990–2002); Plamondon Hospitality Partners (2002–present)
- Website: royrogersrestaurants.com

Roy Rogers Franchise Company, LLC is an American chain of fast food restaurants headquartered in Ballenger Creek, Maryland, with a Frederick postal address, and primarily located in the Mid-Atlantic and Northeastern United States. The chain originated as the rebranding of the RoBee's House of Beef chain of Fort Wayne, Indiana, acquired by the Marriott Corporation in February 1968. However, Marriott first used the Roy Rogers Roast Beef name on conversions of the company's Junior Hot Shoppes in the Washington, D.C. area in April 1968, then the existing RoBee's stores. The name was licensed from actor Roy Rogers, and an ambitious nationwide franchising campaign was launched. At its peak, the chain included over 600 locations. The chain now has 42 locations in five states, either company owned or franchised.

The Roy Rogers chain was sold in 1990 to Imasco, then the parent company of Hardee's, and experienced severe decline as many locations converted to Hardee's. In 2002, the trademark was purchased by Plamondon Companies.

Roy Rogers' menu consists primarily of hamburgers, roast beef sandwiches, fried chicken, nine side items (including french fries), and beverages. Many locations also serve breakfast.

== History ==
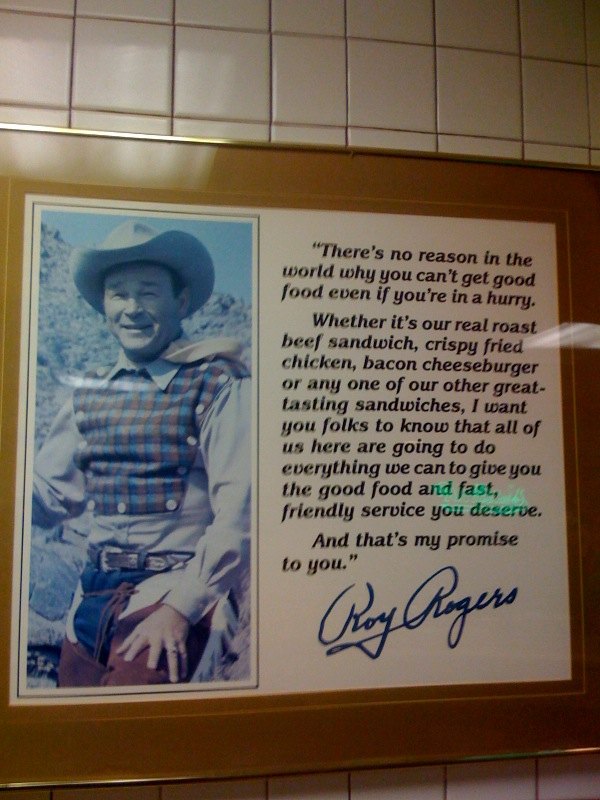
Roy Rogers' picture hangs in every restaurant.

=== 1967–1968: RoBee's and Marriott ===
In 1967, the Azar's Big Boy restaurant franchise started RoBee's House of Beef restaurants in Ft. Wayne, Indiana. The Marriott Corp., which had acquired Bob's Big Boy and the Big Boy trademark in 1967, acquired RoBee's in February 1968 with plans to expand nationwide. RoBee's franchises would first be offered to Big Boy franchisees to coincide with their existing Big Boy territory. At the time there were 13 RoBee's restaurants in six states.

During the acquisition, in January 1968, the competing roast beef chain Arby's sued RoBee's for trademark infringement and (other similarities that it considered) unfair competition. Because "RoBee's" sounded too much like "Arby's" the settlement required a new brand name and Marriott wanted something recognizable. Big Boy founder Bob Wian, then sitting on Marriott's board of directors, was friends with Roy Rogers' agent and suggested that the company approach Rogers about the use of his name. Already interested in associating with a chain restaurant, Rogers was in similar discussions with another company when Marriott called. Nonetheless, he accepted Marriott's offer: Rogers would receive a licensing fee for use of his name and also be paid for personal appearances at the restaurants. The restaurants would be called "Roy Rogers Roast Beef Sandwich" restaurants, and despite Arby's complaints, it retained RoBee's building design and covered wagon logo design.

Several major Big Boy franchisees accepted Marriott's offer and became Roy Rogers regional franchisees, (Note: Elias Brothers and Shoney's were already RoBee's franchisees.) including Abdow's, Frisch's, Elias Brothers, Marc's, and Shoney's which together covered much of the Northeastern, Midwest and Southern US. Pittsburgh franchisee Eat'n Park rejected the offer and took public offense at paying fees to Rogers. In the Pittsburgh area and elsewhere, other regional franchisees were sought who would also subfranchise to smaller operators, and by January 1969, Marriott claimed regional franchises for every state but Alaska. Roy Rogers' restaurants also opened in Canada, franchised to that nation's Big Boy franchisee, JB's of Canada.

Marriott divided the United States into 33 franchise regions and required regional franchisees open a set number of restaurants in a four-year period. Regional franchisees would pay Marriott a 2% royalty, and subfranchisees typically pay the regional franchisee 3%, who would keep the additional 1%. A restaurant required a $35,000 cash investment upfront, (Note: The Pittsburgh regional franchisee charged $36,000.) including $7,500 paid to Marriott. Additionally, the cost of the building and equipment, with seating for 42 persons, cost about $100,000 in 1968, excluding the cost of land. Marriott offered financing but charged an interest rate of 12% on land and 17% for the building. The prototype restaurant seated 40 to 45 persons with additional outdoor seating on an optional patio in front of the building, but actual restaurants varied, one franchisee's dining area accommodating 75 persons.

The first Roy Rogers restaurant opened up on Co- founder and Hot Shoppes manager, Henry L. Wright's property in April 1968 in the Bailey's Crossroads section of Falls Church, Virginia, on the corner of Leesburg Pike and Carlin Springs Road (5603 Leesburg Pike). Another opened at 5214 River Road, in Bethesda, Maryland. The area was selected because Marriott was headquartered in metropolitan Washington, D.C., with the River Road unit located directly across the street. (Marriott executives and Marriott family members were frequent patrons of this store.) These first locations were conversions of Jr. Hot Shoppes, Marriott's existing fast food chain. (Note: As of February 2018, McDonald's operates at both listed sites.) In May 1968, RoBee's units began to open as Roy Rogers. Rogers made a four-state tour of namesake restaurants in the Southern U.S., appearing at each location for an hour, shaking hands and handing out signed photographs. Filming for the first television commercials advertising Roy Rogers Restaurants took place in the Apple Valley, California, area where Rogers lived with his family. In 1968 and 1969, Rogers and friends, Earl Bascom and Mel Marion, were filmed at various locations including the historic Las Flores Ranch in Summit Valley and the Campbell Ranch in Victorville.

=== 1968–1989: Growth and challenges ===
Rapid growth began in 1968 and Marriott made optimistic projections. In October 1968, there were reportedly 38 units open and 65 under construction, and by December, 56 opened with 39 under construction. Marriott projected 700 or more Roy Rogers restaurants in four years. By June 1969, 105 units were open with a new projection of 870 in four years. A February 1970 newspaper article reported that over 160 units were in operation. However, growth halted in 1970, when Marriott suspended Roy Rogers franchising, due to financial losses from closing failing locations. The following year, the Texas–based regional franchise, Ram-Hart Systems, filed for Chapter 11 protection, asking to terminate unprofitable leases, which made the entire chain unprofitable. After franchising resumed, only 172 restaurants were open by September 1972, a quarter of the 700 stores projected four years earlier.

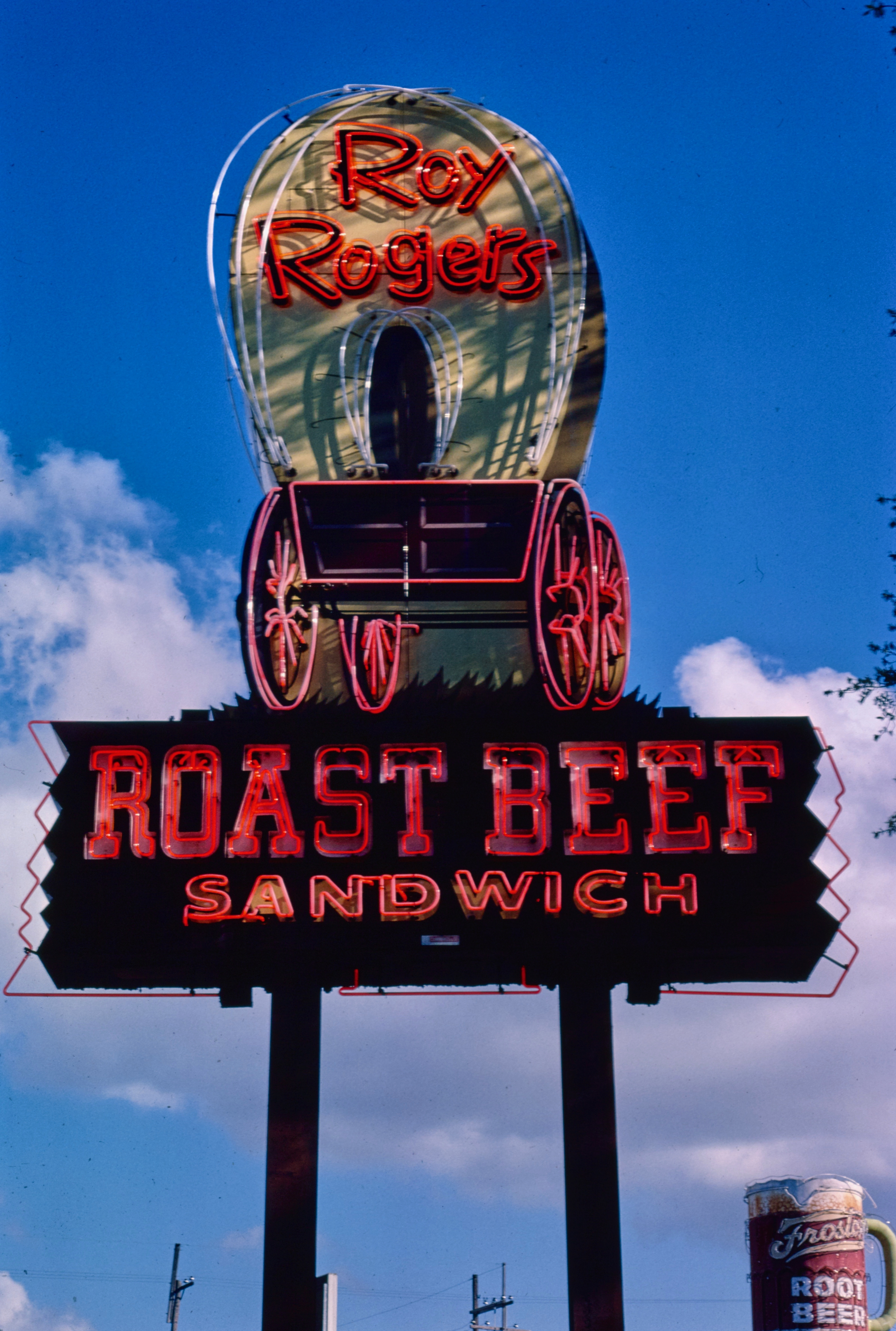
A sign of Roy Rogers Restaurant in Uptown New Orleans, 1982

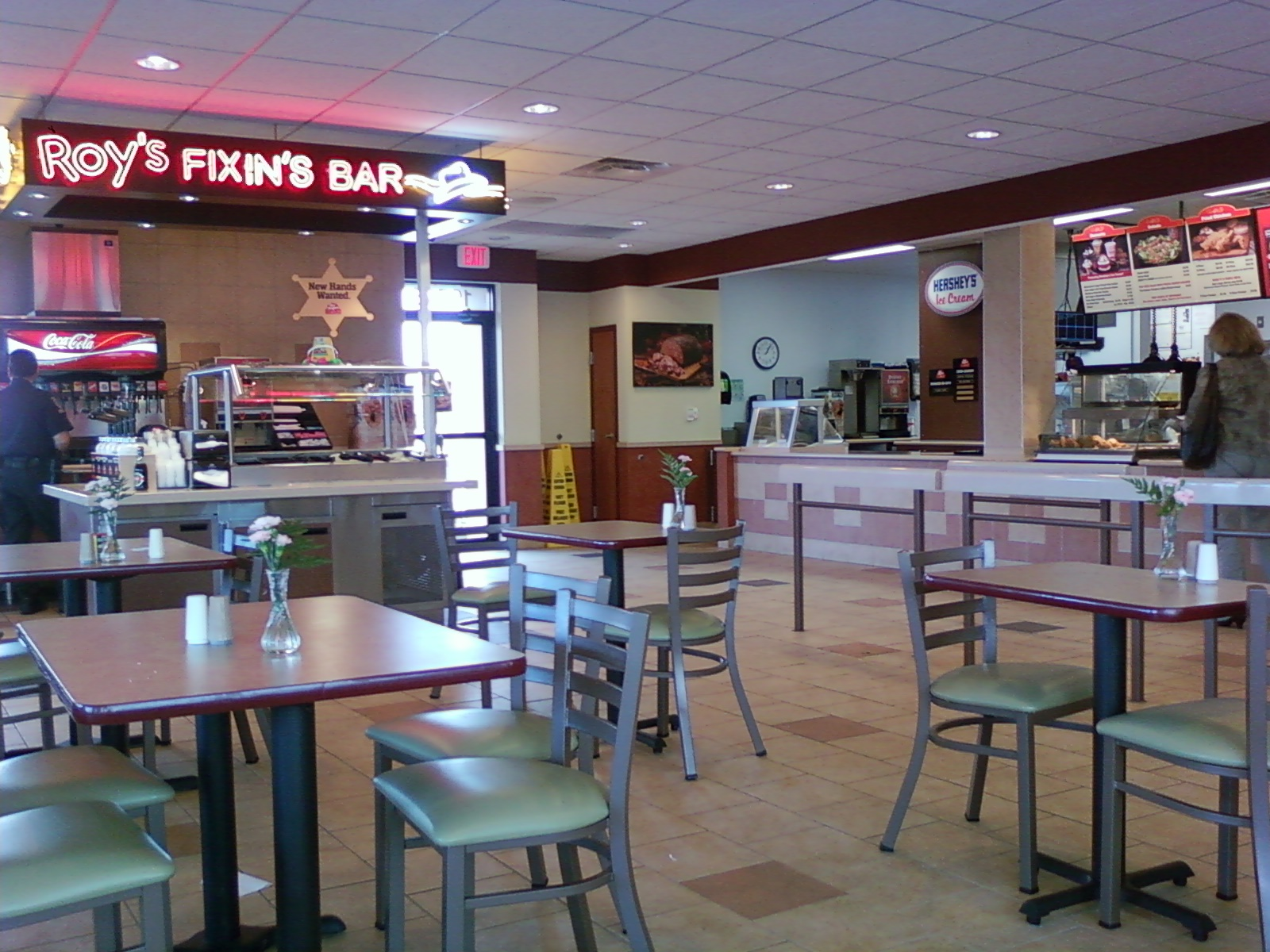
Roy Rogers Restaurant in Germantown, Maryland, owned by the Plamondon Companies, opened in 2009

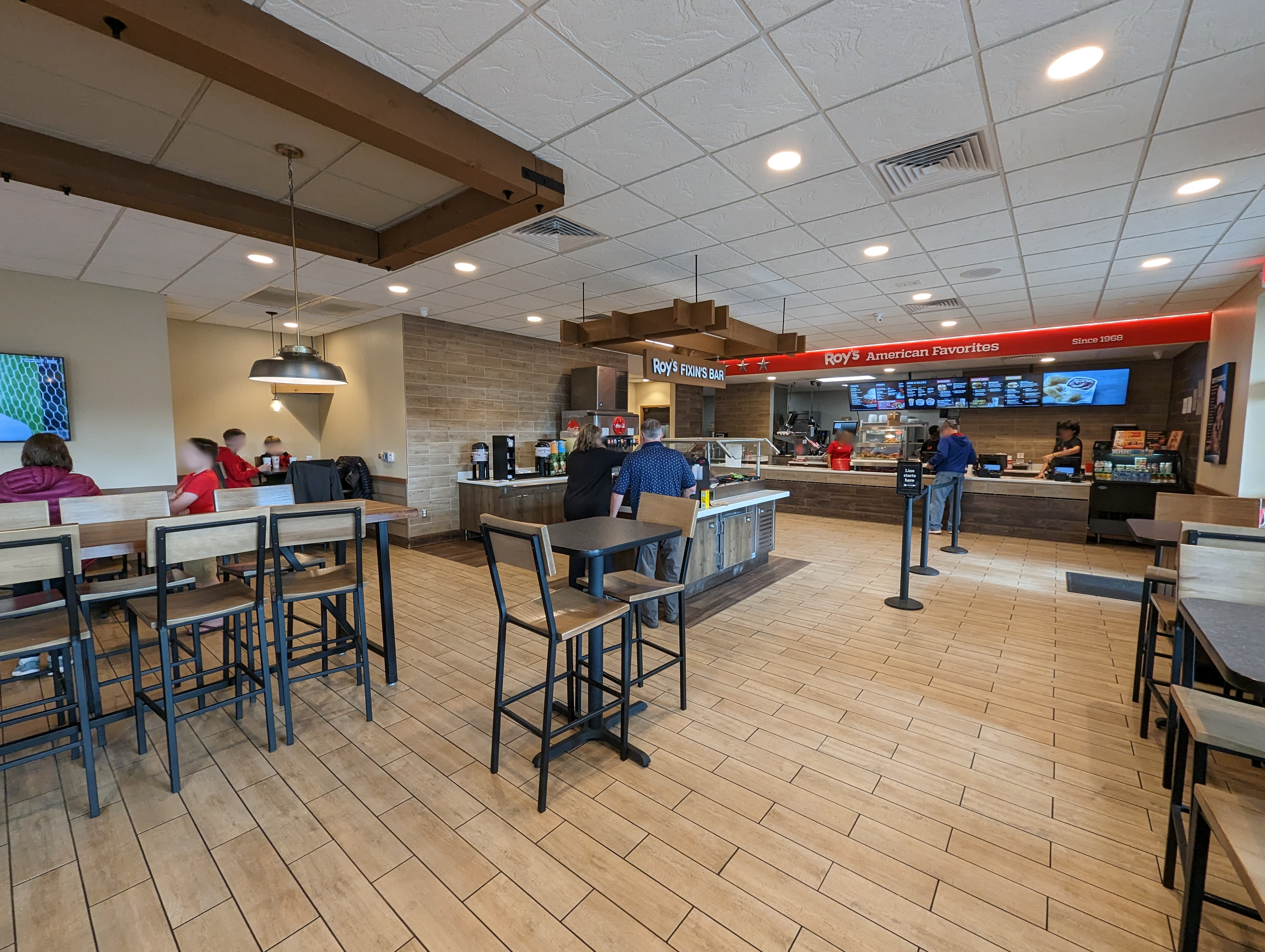
Roy Rogers Restaurant in Belle Haven, Fairfax County, Virginia, completely remodeled in 2021 after a fire

In 1976, a Roy Rogers in Fairfax, Virginia, was robbed, where five employees were herded into the restaurant's freezer and shot in the head. Only one survived.

On August 30, 1977, Roy Rogers was struck by a cottage cheese pie thrown by a 17 year old while Rogers and his Sons of the Pioneers singers were performing at a Fairfax restaurant. The youth pleaded guilty a month later and was fined $100.

In 1982, Marriott bought the Gino's restaurant chain for $48.6 million. The company converted 180 of the 313 restaurants to Roy Rogers to expand in the Baltimore/Washington area.

Also in 1982, Marriott sued the Riese family, a franchisee, when they discovered the Rieses were planning to relocate a Roy Rogers restaurant with a Häagen Dazs and a Pizza Hut in Times Square. The Riese family won the suit, and the Riese Organization later developed other food courts in New York City.

=== 1990–1997: Hardee's ===
In 1990, Marriott sold the chain for $365 million to Imasco, the parent company of Hardee's, a Midwestern and Southern chain seeking further expansion into the Mid-Atlantic market. The remaining non-franchised Roy Rogers locations were converted into Hardee's restaurants, although many of the converted Hardee's continued to offer Roy Rogers' fried chicken. This conversion caused a customer revolt and the units returned to the Roy Rogers' brand. The restaurants promoted new flame-broiled hamburgers, but they were not the same as the original Roy Rogers products and later failed.

Hardee's finally sold the remaining Roy Rogers locations to McDonald's, Wendy's, and Boston Market between 1994 and 1996. This left 13 Roy Rogers franchisees, with two dozen free-standing locations, in addition to locations owned by HMSHost in travel plazas along highways in the Northeast.

Prior to the Hardee's acquisition, Roy Rogers cooked its fries in a blend of beef tallow and vegetable oil. Hardee's, which had already replaced tallow with all vegetable shortening, implemented the same procedure for Roy Rogers.

=== 1997–present: CKE, Imasco, Plamondon Companies ===
In 1997, CKE Restaurants acquired Hardee's from Imasco, but Imasco retained the Roy Rogers trademark and franchise system. The Riese family, which owned 18 Roy Rogers restaurants, sued CKE Restaurants and Imasco for $10 million in 1997, claiming the Roy Rogers chain has been destroyed through "a series of marketing errors of epic proportions."

Imasco sold Roy Rogers to Plamondon Enterprises (now Plamondon Companies) in 2002, after three years of negotiation. Roy Rogers was relaunched as Roy Rogers Franchise Company, LLC. Plamondon had already opened the first new Roy Rogers restaurant in Frederick, Maryland, in 2000. At the time of the sale, there were 63 existing Roy Rogers franchises in nine states.

In 2021, Roy Rogers announced a strategy to build concentrically out of core markets in the Mid-Atlantic, like Maryland, Virginia, West Virginia, and Pennsylvania. The growth circle would slowly get bigger and include New York, the Eastern Seaboard, and states like Ohio, Tennessee, Florida, Texas, Louisiana, Mississippi, Alabama, and Georgia. The next year, the company announced a new partnership with One Holland Corporation restaurant group and planned to open 10 new Roy Rogers locations over the next six years in the Cincinnati metropolitan area. The new locations would be in Hamilton, Butler, and Clermont counties in Southwest Ohio; Boone, Kenton, and Campbell counties in Northern Kentucky; and Dearborn County in Southeast Indiana. Despite these plans, a spokesperson for One Holland Corp. says that none will be opened after the Cleves, Ohio, location, failed their expectations and closed in September 2024 after opening in February of the previous year.

In 2025, Roy Rogers will open a third location in Leesburg, Virginia, where it has already has a strong presence as well as one in Cherry Hill, New Jersey.

== Products and services ==
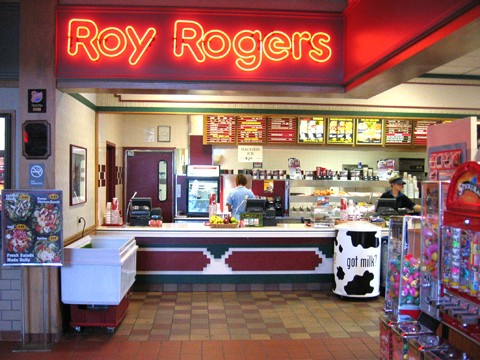
Roy Rogers Restaurant at the Indian Castle Service Plaza in Danube, New York, on the New York State Thruway. This location, along with the entire service plaza, closed in July 2021 as part of a state incentive to modernize all service plazas in the state by demolishing them and rebuilding them. The rebuilt service center later opened in August 2022 and features a Popeyes and Starbucks location. It was the first rebuilt travel plaza as part of the incentive to open.

Though standard Roy Rogers locations serve food in a typical fast-food fashion, some locations (such as the locations that were formerly Jr. Hot Shoppes) and the franchises located throughout Mid-Atlantic highway rest-stops serve the food in a cafeteria-style. An exception is the Allentown service plaza on the Pennsylvania Turnpike's Northeast Extension, which serves its customers in the typical fast-food fashion since it reopened in May 2008 (the entire service plaza had been rebuilt from its original form, which included cafeteria-style serving).

In the cafeteria-style restaurants, customers push their trays on rails past stations stocked with pre-wrapped packages of hamburgers, cheeseburgers, and roast-beef sandwiches. A feature of this chain in any of the locations is the Fixin's Bar which features numerous condiments. Due to this feature, sandwich items are delivered without any of the customary garnishes. After selecting and paying for these items, patrons can garnish them to their own taste at the Fixin's Bar with such items as ketchup, BBQ sauce, mayonnaise, horseradish sauce, lettuce, tomatoes, pickles, and onions. Numerous locations offer hand-dipped milkshakes made with Edy's Ice Cream.

Popular items on the menu are roast beef sandwiches and fried chicken, which was advertised by Roy Rogers under the "Pappy Parker" name beginning in the 1970s using a cartoon prospector (the Pappy Parker name was inherited from Marriott's original Hot Shoppes chain). Other signature items at Roy Rogers are the Gold Rush chicken sandwich (a fried chicken breast with bacon, a slice of Monterey Jack cheese, and a honey-based BBQ sauce) and the Double-R Bar Burger (a cheeseburger with ham). The side items featured at Roy Rogers are french fries, baked potatoes, mashed potatoes with gravy, and baked beans. Seasonal items that select Roy Rogers locations occasionally offer include the beer-battered cod sandwich and platter.

== Locations ==
Roy Rogers Restaurants are located in the following states, with number of locations.

- Maryland: 22
- New Jersey: 4
- Pennsylvania: 7
- Virginia: 8
- West Virginia: 1

As of March 2025, there are 42 Roy Rogers restaurants.

== See also ==
- List of hamburger restaurants
- List of fast-food chicken restaurants
