= Pal's Shanty Tavern =

Pair of dive bars in Portland, Oregon, U.S.

Coordinates: 45.53795°N 122.61537°W

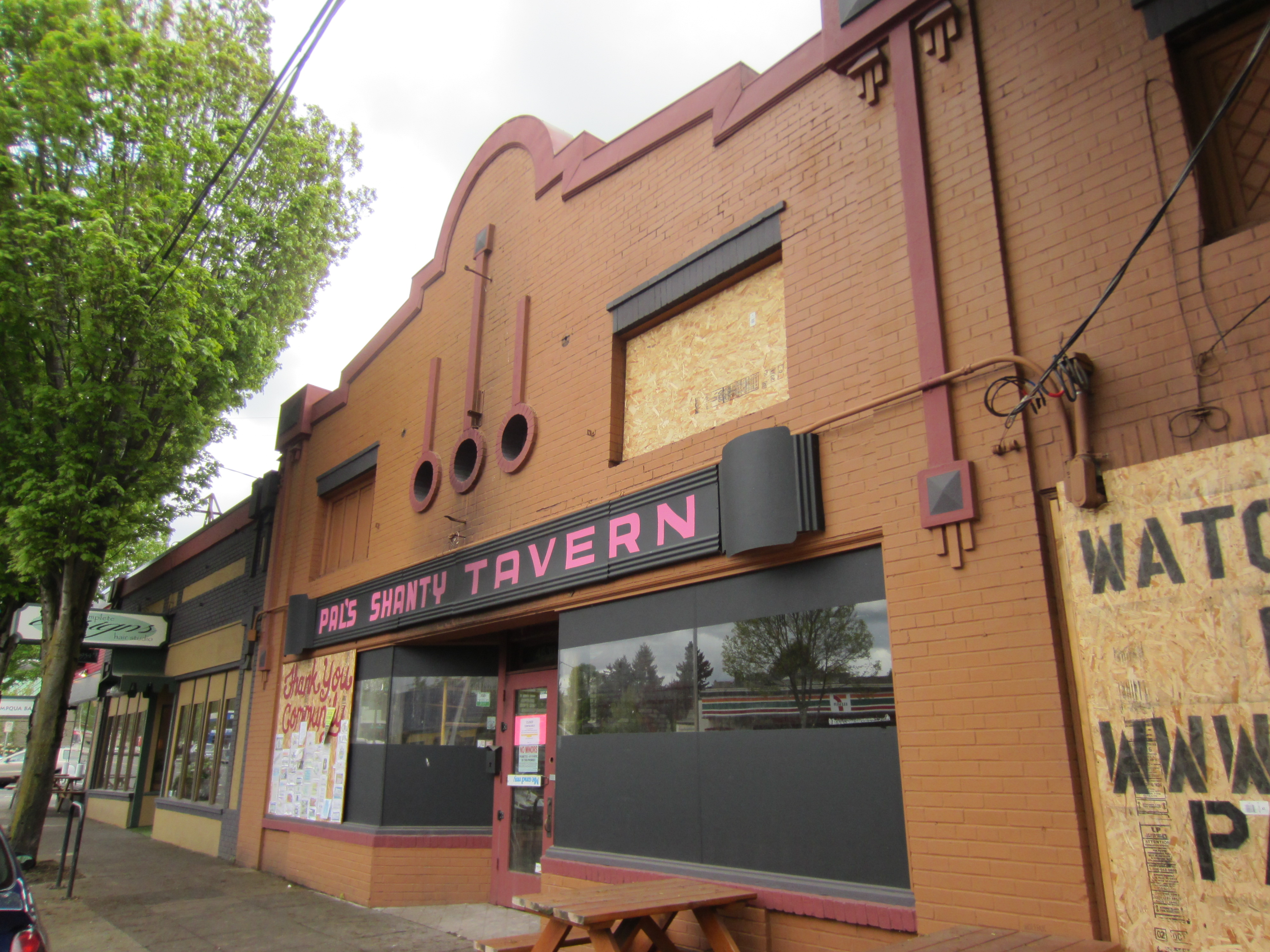
- Exterior of the original bar in 2014, after closing because of arson
- Interactive map of Pal's Shanty Tavern
- Address: Portland, Oregon; United States

Pal's Shanty Tavern refers to a pair of dive bars in Portland, Oregon.

== Northeast Portland ==
The original bar opened in northeast Portland's Hollywood neighborhood in the 1960s. It "had a small-town vibe, with wood-paneled walls, neon beer signs and a cast of friendly regulars", operating in a building which had screened silent films as Elite Theatre from 1914 to 1921. The building was designed by Roberts and Roberts, and was also later known as Rose City Park and the Rose City.

The bar's menu included soft-shell clams, Parmesan garlic bread, and beer. It closed in 2013, due to arson, and was replaced by a Hot Lips Pizza. Two men were arrested for starting the fire, one of whom was an employee. The bar was owned by Cliff and Martha Hanson, and later their children Jim and Sharon. It is included in Laura O. Foster's 2016 book Walking with Ramona: Exploring Beverly Cleary's Portland.

== Southwest Portland ==
A second bar opened in southwest Portland in 1993, with former Belinda's chef Ross Pullen.

== See also ==
- List of dive bars
