= Laura Foster =

Laura Foster may refer to:

- Laura E. Foster (1871–1920), American illustrator and cartoonist
- Laura O. Foster, American writer
- Laura Foster, murder victim of Tom Dula
- Laura Foster, fictional character in Simon and Laura
