= Ace's & Deuce's Lounge =

Dive bar and restaurant in Pittsburgh, Pennsylvania, U.S.

- Signage
- Interactive map of Ace's & Deuce's Lounge

Restaurant information
- Closed: September 14, 2022
- Location: 1400 Fifth Ave, Pittsburgh, Allegheny, Pennsylvania, 15219
- Coordinates: 40.43851678442749°N 79.98629063818125°W

Ace's & Deuce's Lounge was a lounge and dive bar located on Fifth Avenue in Uptown Pittsburgh, Pennsylvania, United States.

== Police raid ==
On March 18, 2022, It was reported that the Allegheny County Health Department would shut down Ace's and Deuce's Lounge temporarily after a raid by the Pennsylvania State Police, as part of their "Nuisance Bar Task Force" search, uncovered a cache of drugs (suspected to be cocaine and cannabis) as well as two stolen firearms.

== Closure ==
On September 14, 2022 the Allegheny County Health Department ordered Ace's and Deuces to close after the business failed to appear at a pre-suspension hearing about a $3,300 civil penalty that was assessed in April.

== See also ==
- List of dive bars
