= Dry Creek Café & Boat Dock =

- Interactive map of Dry Creek Café & Boat Dock

Restaurant information
- Established: 1953
- Closed: October 31, 2021
- Previous owner: Jay "Buddy" Reynolds (?-2021)
- Location: 4812 Mt Bonnell Rd, Austin, TX (formerly), Austin, Travis, Texas, 78731, United States
- Coordinates: 30.333117194827658°N 97.77637928537831°W

Dry Creek Café & Boat Dock was a dive bar and boat dock located on Mount Bonnell Road in Austin, Texas. After 68 years in operation, and a rooftop deck for watching sunsets, it closed on October 31, 2021, after roughly seven decades in business.

== History ==
Sources differ on when the bar opened. Austin Monthly and KXAN date it to 1953 while the Austin American-Statesman reported that Sarah Ransom bought the bar from her brothers in 1956 and opened it as Dry Creek Cafe and Boat Dock. When it opened, the bar stood outside the Austin city limits on what was then the edge of town.

=== Ownership ===
Ransom ran the bar for decades and became known for her blunt manner and her rules about customers' bottles. In 1984, she sold it to her son, Jay "Buddy" Reynolds, who owned it for the rest of its history. Ransom died in 2009 at the age of 95.

=== Closure ===
In September 2021, bar manager Elly Barksdale announced that the bar would close at the end of October, saying it was surrounded by multimillion-dollar homes, drew no foot traffic and was no longer profitable. Reynolds said he was retiring and had sold the property. The bar held final celebrations on October 30 and 31, 2021, with live music and a Halloween costume theme on the last night. Regulars campaigned to have the building designated a historic landmark, but the sale went ahead. According to Reynolds, the new owners planned to keep the building and convert it into a camp for orphaned children.

== See also ==
- List of dive bars
