= Dee's Cafe =

Bar in Pittsburgh, Pennsylvania, U.S.

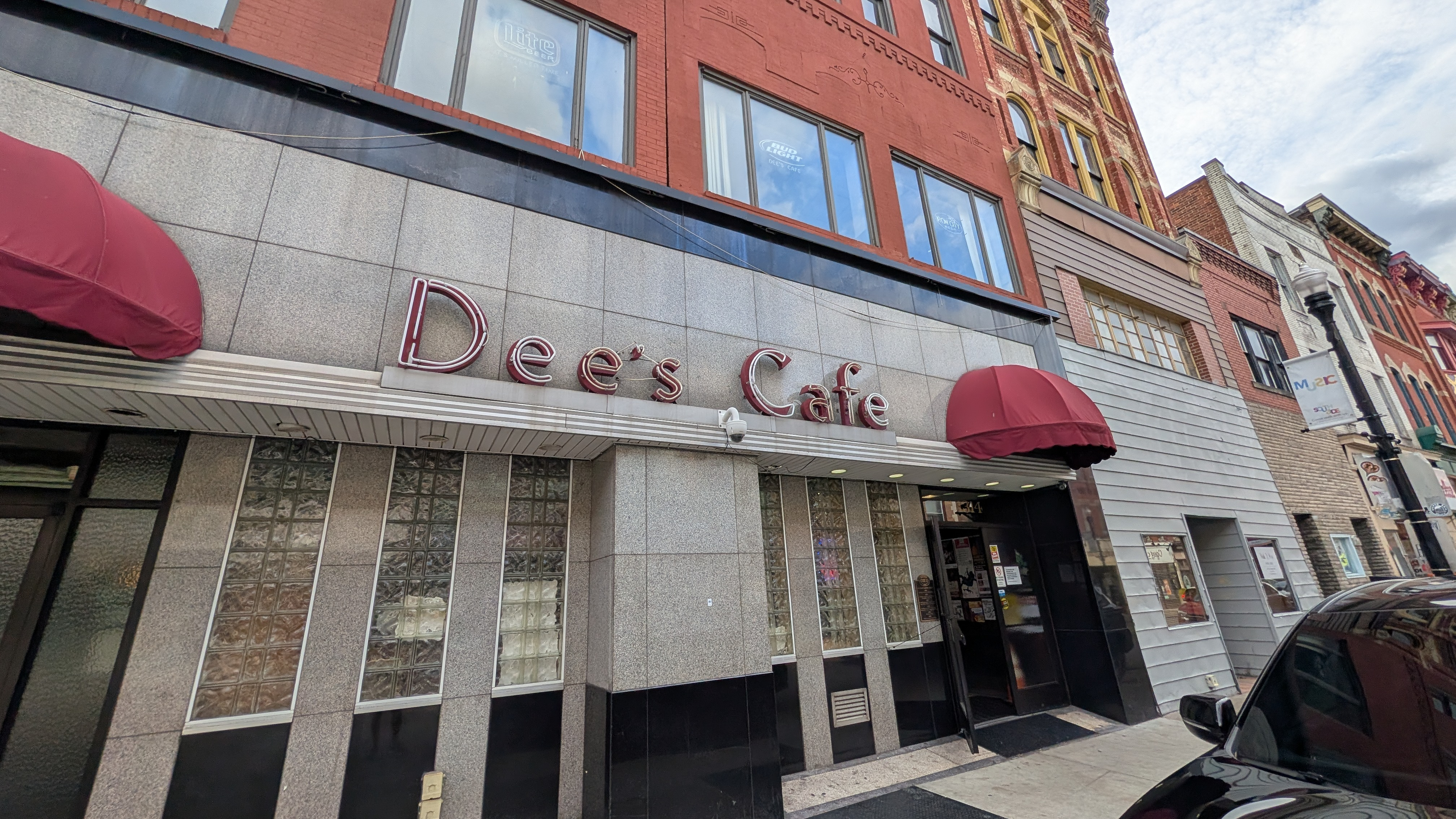
- The bar's exterior in 2025
- Interactive map of Dee's Cafe

Restaurant information
- Established: 1959
- Previous owner: Bill Martin
- Location: 1314 East Carson St, Pittsburgh, Allegheny, Pennsylvania, 15203, United States
- Coordinates: 40.4287°N 79.9849°W
- Website: deescafe.com

Dee's Cafe is a dive bar in Pittsburgh, Pennsylvania's South Side neighborhood established in 1959.

== Description ==
Dee's Cafe is a two-story dive bar located on Pittsburgh's historic East Carson Street in the city's South Side neighborhood. It was established in 1959. The building's exterior has a bright red neon sign and a facade of opaque glass blocks.

The interior consists of two floors. The ground floor features a long, U-shaped bar, booths, and a small adjoining room with pool tables. A notable mural by local artist Rick Bach, caricaturing bar regulars, is painted on the back wall of this room. The second floor, known as "The Attic," contains a second bar, darts, a ping pong table, and a larger poolroom. In total, the bar operates seven pool tables and hosts pool leagues.

The establishment maintains a cash-only policy and is one of the few remaining bars in the city that permits smoking.

During the 1990s, Dee’s Cafe was among several alternative venues, such as the Beehive coffeehouse, that contributed to the South Side’s emergence as an entertainment district and center of Pittsburgh’s developing art scene. In 2006, the bar received national recognition when Esquire magazine named it to its annual list of the "Best Bars in America."

Bill Martin, who owned Dee's Cafe for over 30 years, retired in 2011 and died in 2016.

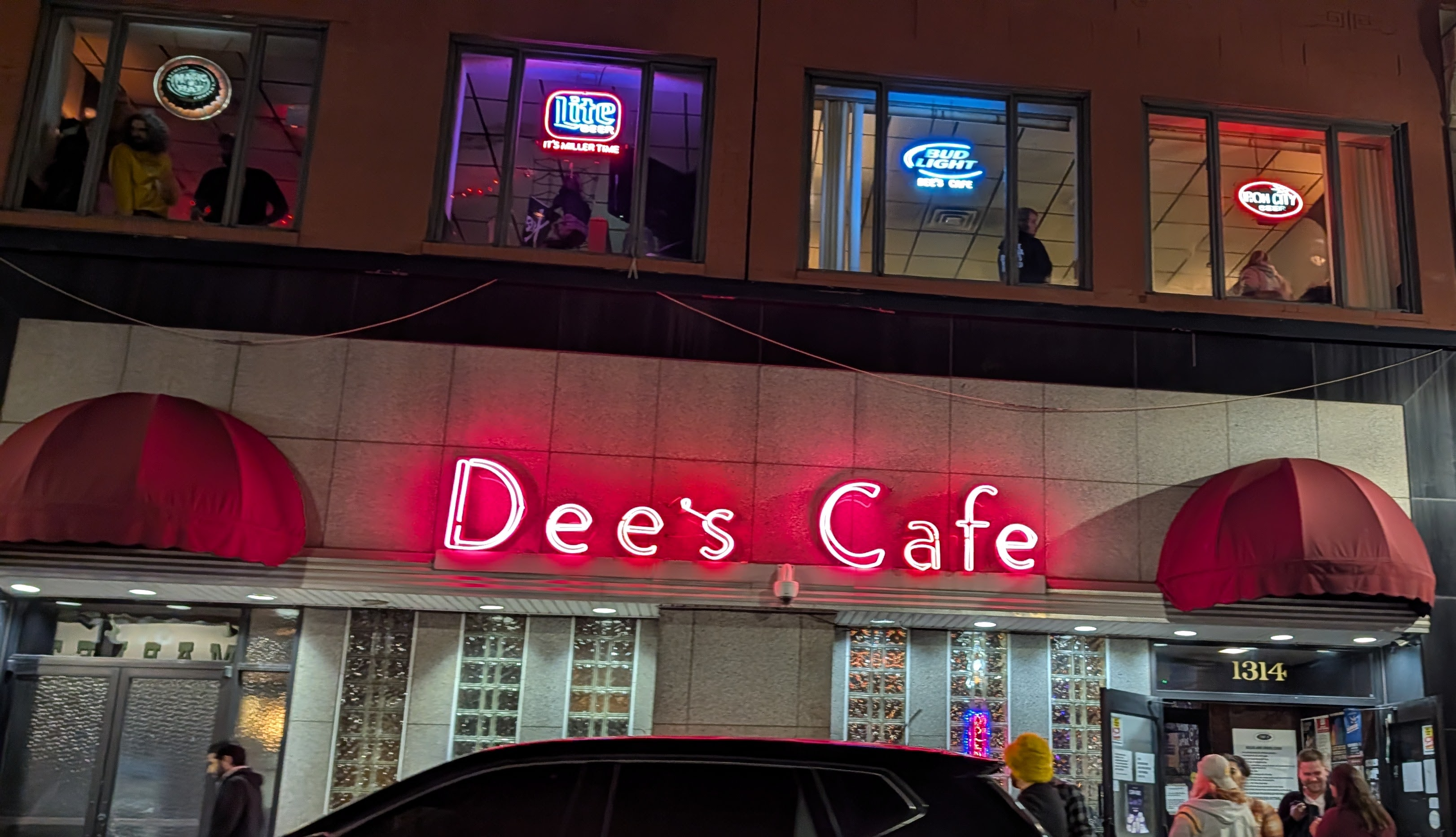
The bar's exterior, 2025

== See also ==
- List of dive bars
