= Yamhill Pub =

Dive bar in Portland, Oregon, U.S.

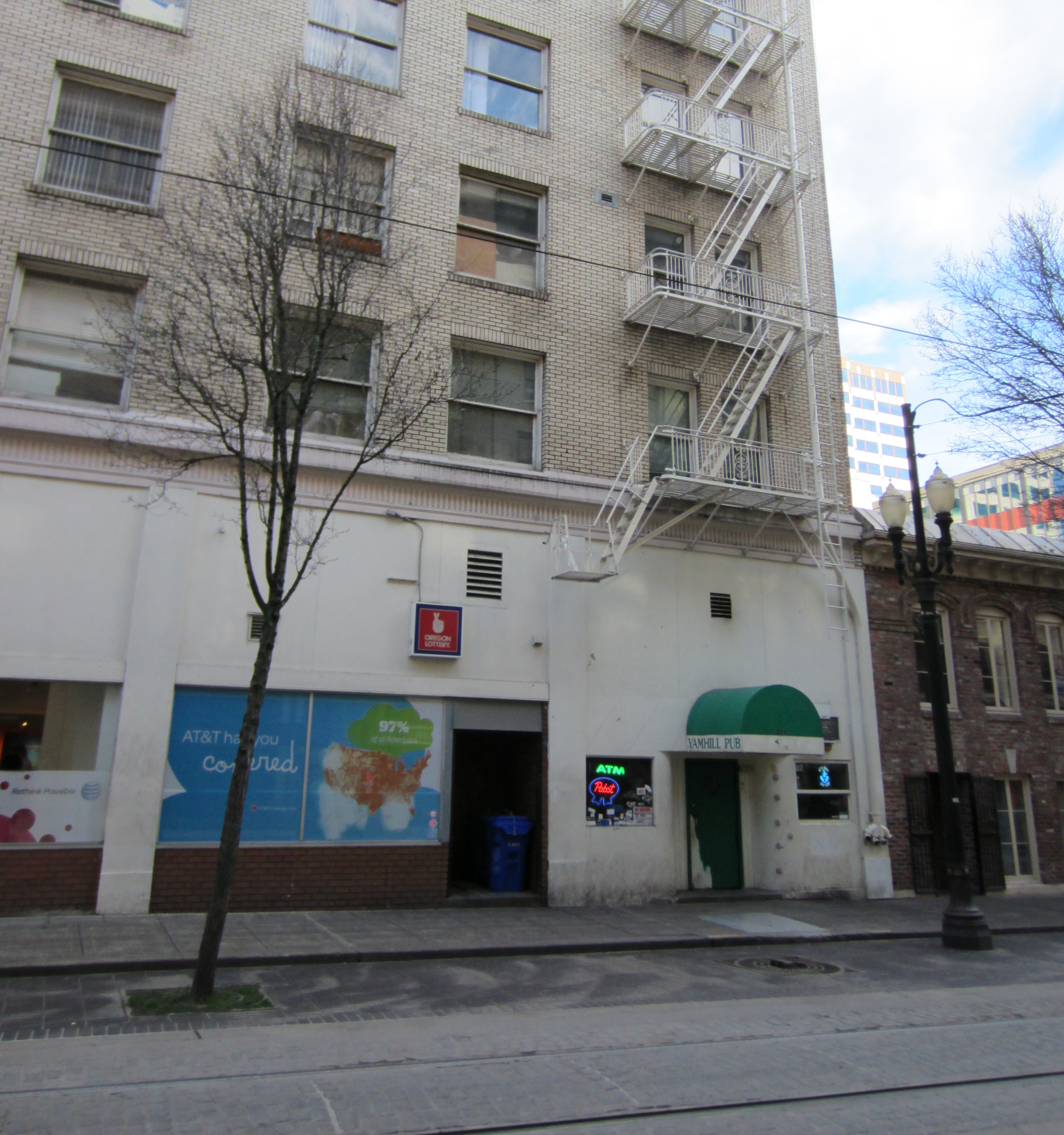
- The bar's exterior in 2012
- Interactive map of Yamhill Pub

Restaurant information
- Location: Portland, Multnomah, Oregon, United States
- Coordinates: 45°31′3.2″N 122°40′31.4″W

Yamhill Pub is a dive bar in Portland, Oregon, in the United States. Established in 1939, the bar has been recognized as the top Pabst Blue Ribbon seller in Oregon.

== Description ==
In 2017, Matthew Singer of Willamette Week wrote, "Announcing itself with only a stained green awning above the doorway, it's a hole-in-the-wall in the sense that it appears to have been gnawed into the side of a building by angry rodents. Graffiti covers practically every square inch like the walls of a punk club restroom, with a scent to match, so you can imagine what the actual restrooms are like. Food options are limited to chips, beef jerky and microwavables best left in the freezer." The newspaper's Jay Horton said in 2018, "Every square inch of the smallish barroom—save the pristine Batman pinball machine, kept untouched by pub fiat—has been so heavily scrawled with graffiti that overlapping tags blur together like modish cave paintings."

== History ==
Kevin Hill had owned the bar for approximately thirty years, as of 2024.

== Reception ==
Matthew Singer wrote, " Appreciating downtown's Yamhill Pub for what it is requires an understanding of what it's not. It is not clean. It is not pretty. It's not a 'gastropub' or 'mixology lab,' and even calling it a 'dive' seems generous." Pete Cottell included Yamhill Pub in Thrillist's 2015 and 2019 list of the city's best dive bars. In 2018, Grant Butler of The Oregonian said, "if you're looking for a place where you'll see motion rings on the top of your cheap Pabst every time a trail rattles by, this is it. We're not really sure what the allure is, but it's still around, so someone's going here." Alex Frane and Alli Fodor included Yamhill Pub in Eater Portland's 2019 list, "The Ultimate Guide to Portland's Iconic Dive Bars".

== See also ==
- List of dive bars
