= Bubba's Sulky Lounge =

Dive bar and nightclub in Portland, Maine

- Interactive map of Bubba's Sulky Lounge

Restaurant information
- Established: 1959
- Owner: Robert "Bubba" Larkin
- Location: 92 Portland Street, Portland, Maine, 04101, United States
- Coordinates: 43.6576°N 70.2650°W
- Website: www.bubbassulkylounge.com

Bubba's Sulky Lounge is a dive bar and nightclub in the Parkside neighborhood of Portland, Maine.

Bubba's was opened on Lancaster Street in Portland in 1959 by Robert "Bubba" Larkin, and moved to its current location in the Bayside neighborhood in 1961. In the 1970s, "Sulky Lounge" was added to the name, referencing sulkies and Larkin's love of harness racing. Originally opened as a restaurant and bar, the establishment is now open only on Fridays and Saturdays for themed dance nights. It is known for its over-the-top, antique decor, including three light-up dance floors, mannequins, a post-office themed nook, and over 1,000 vintage lunchboxes.

In 2015, Bubba's was named the 7th best dive bar in America by The Daily Meal. It was the subject of a song by Portland native Patty Griffin, and was featured in John Connolly's Charlie Parker book series.

== See also ==
- List of dive bars
