= Kelly's Olympian =

Bar in Portland, Oregon, U.S.

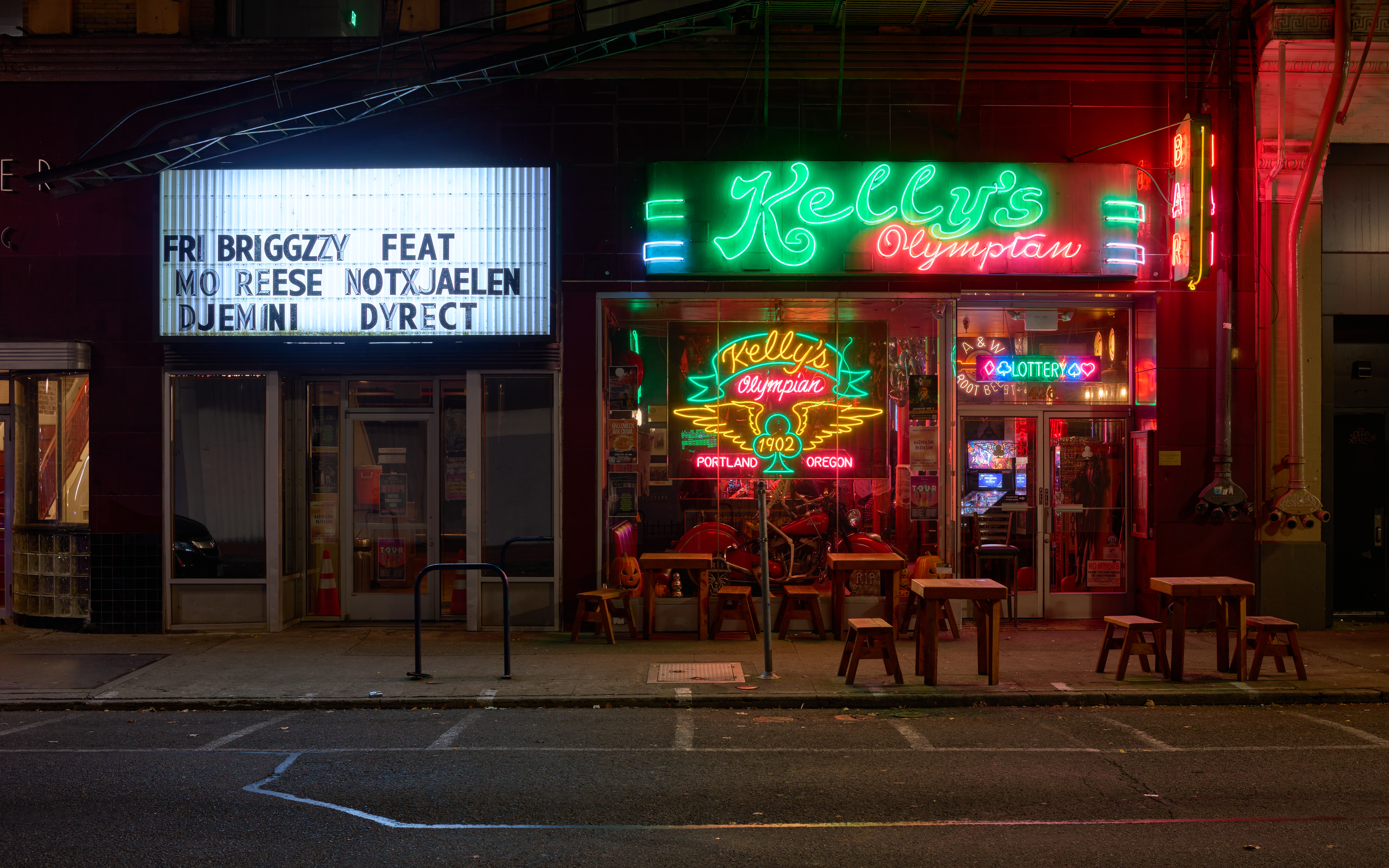
- Interactive map of Kelly's Olympian

Restaurant information
- Established: 1902
- Location: 426 SW Washington Street, Portland, Multnomah, Oregon, 97204, United States
- Coordinates: 45.5199°N 122.6765°W
- Website: kellysolympian.com

Kelly's Olympian is among the oldest bars in Portland, Oregon, established in 1902. The space has been called a dive bar and a performance venue.

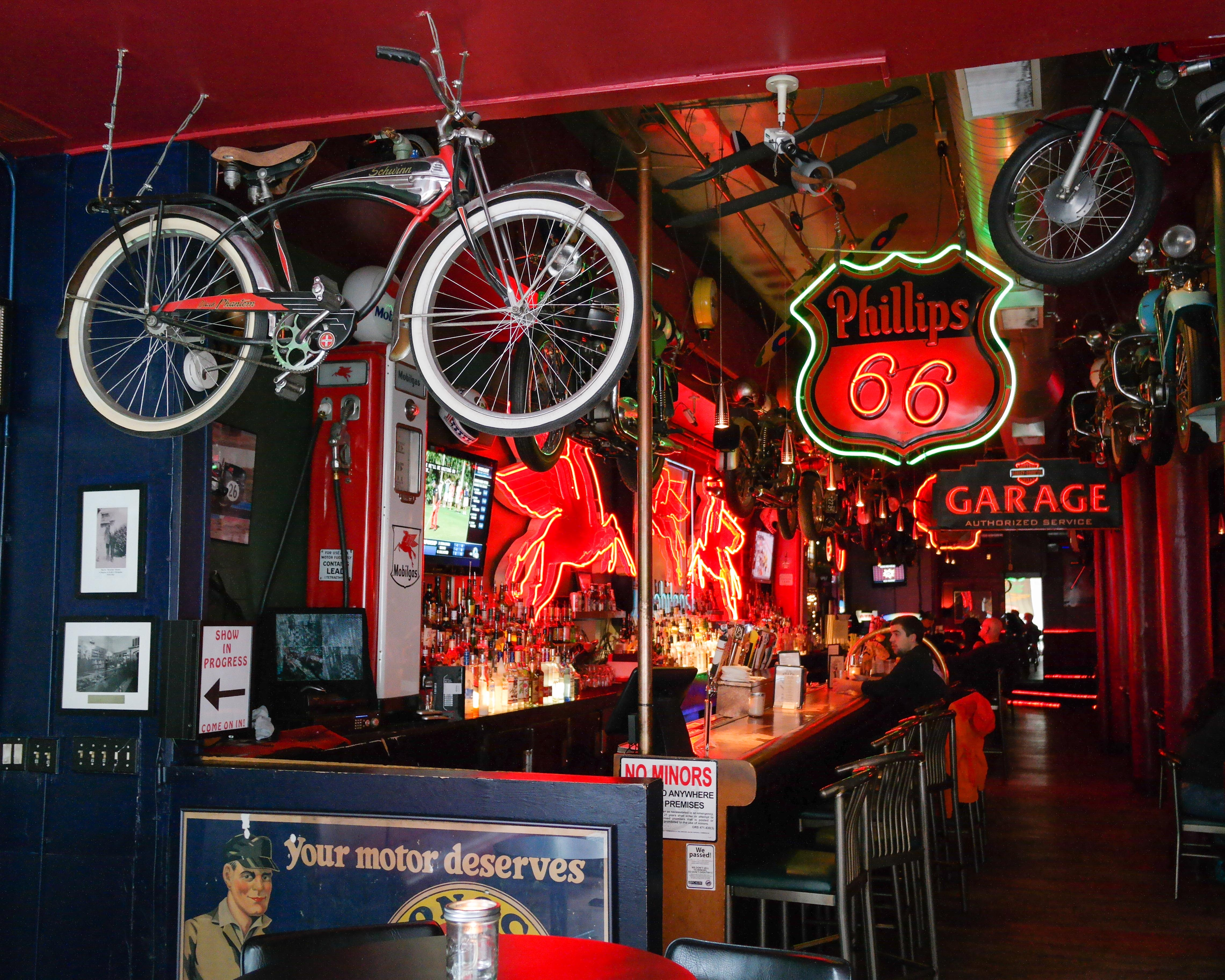
The interior, 2014

== See also ==
- List of dive bars
