= The Know (Portland, Oregon) =

Bar in Portland, Oregon

- Location in Portland, Oregon
- Address: 2026 Northeast Alberta Street
- Location: Portland, Oregon, United States
- Coordinates: 45.55893°N 122.64432°W
- Owner: Ryan Stowe

Website
- theknowpdx.com

The Know was a bar in northeast Portland, Oregon, in the United States.

== Description ==
The Know, located at 2026 Northeast Alberta Street near the Alberta Arts District in Portland's Vernon neighborhood, was a dive bar and music venue known for hosting garage rock, heavy metal, and punk rock music. In 2014, Matthew Korfhage of Willamette Week called the venue "a ramshackle, graffitied, dirt-cheap drinking hole that has become Portland's most reliable home of punk and hard rock". In 2016, Willamette Week's Matthew Singer described The Know as the city's "premier bastion of noise" and "Alberta's lone holdout of dirty Old Portland", with sticky floors from spilled beer and bathrooms that "would give veterans of CBGB's heyday flashbacks".

== History ==
The Modern Lovers' Jonathan Richman performed two series of multi-night stands at the venue, in 2010 and 2012.

In 2014, the building which houses The Know was put up for sale. Owner Ryan Stowe confirmed that the bar had two years left on its lease. He hoped to continue operating on Alberta Street but expressed concern over rising rent costs and said the venue might need to relocate. Stowe told Willamette Week, "We had an empty lot across the street from us for almost eight years. Then a bunch of stores went into the Acme Glass building, all these places that had been there for generations. The owners saw dollar signs and sold the building."

In 2016, the venue announced plans to close by the end of the year due to rising rent costs. Stowe said:

I honestly can't believe we're closing up shop on Alberta. So many awesome shows and regulars, but the damn money moved in and they'd rather have a boutique salt shop where we are now than a very real, down-to-earth bar and venue that has meant so much to countless people and bands over the last 12 years... The yuppies won this round, but we'll re-open in a better place, away from 'Division St. Northeast.'

The bar's final show was scheduled for November 30, 2016. Stowe intended to reopen at another location.

== See also ==
- Culture of Portland, Oregon
- List of dive bars
