= Low Brow Lounge =

Dive bar in Portland, Oregon, U.S.

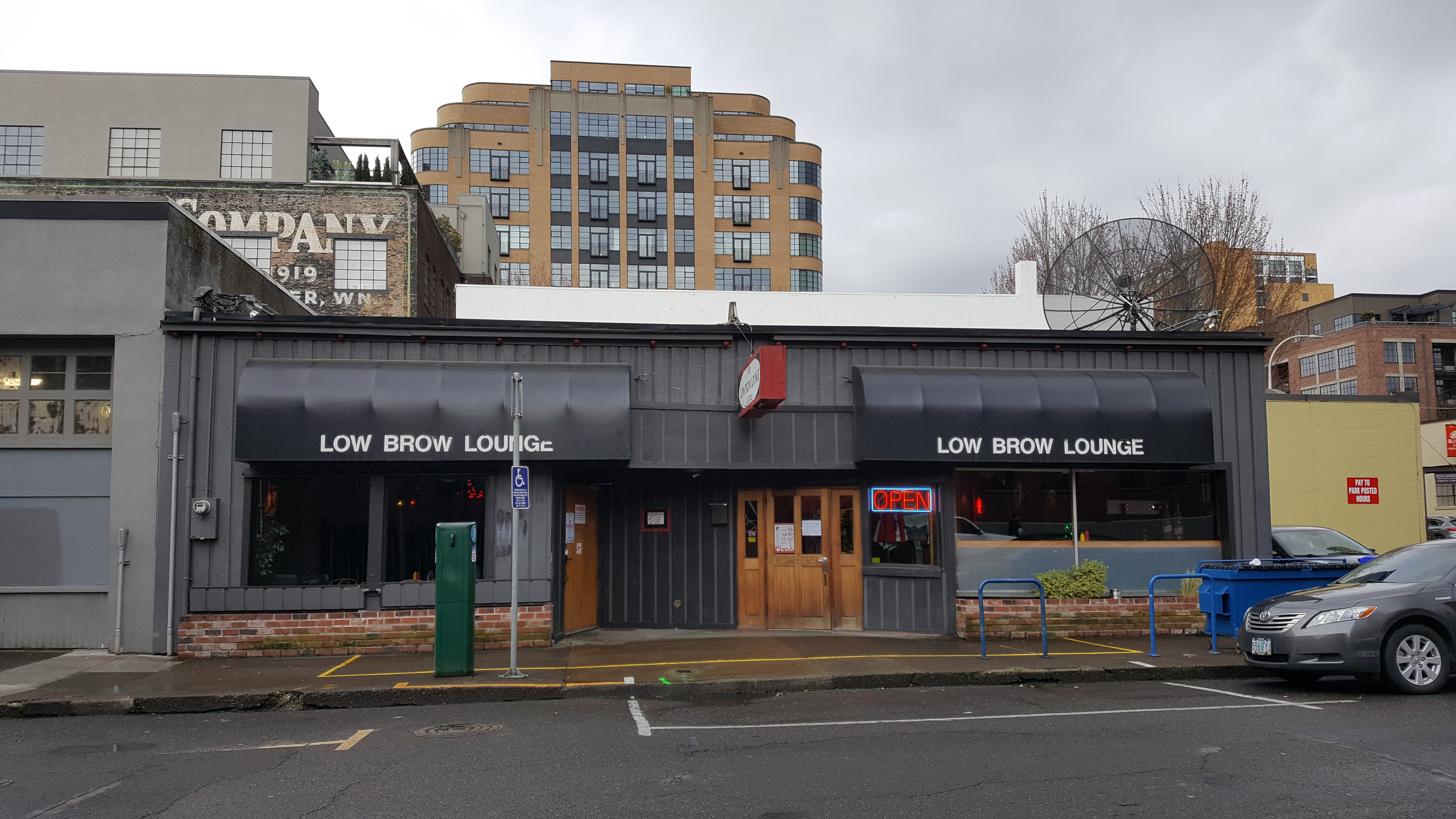
- The bar's front exterior in 2018
- Interactive map of Low Brow Lounge

Restaurant information
- Established: 1998
- Location: 1036 Northwest Hoyt Street, Portland, Oregon, 97209, United States
- Coordinates: 45.5272°N 122.6819°W
- Website: lowbrowpdx.com

Low Brow Lounge is a dive bar and restaurant in Portland, Oregon's Pearl District, in the United States. It opened in 1998.

== Description ==
Portland Monthly has described Low Brow as the Pearl District's "diviest dive bar", serving the neighborhood's "working people" with "some of the greasiest food around". Thrillist has said the establishment is "true to its name", with "no frills" and "just cold beer and solid bar snacks".

== History ==
The Low Brow Lounge was stablished in 1998, and claims to be the first tater tot bar. Minors can accompany guardians on the side of the restaurant without a bar, as of 2016.

== Reception ==
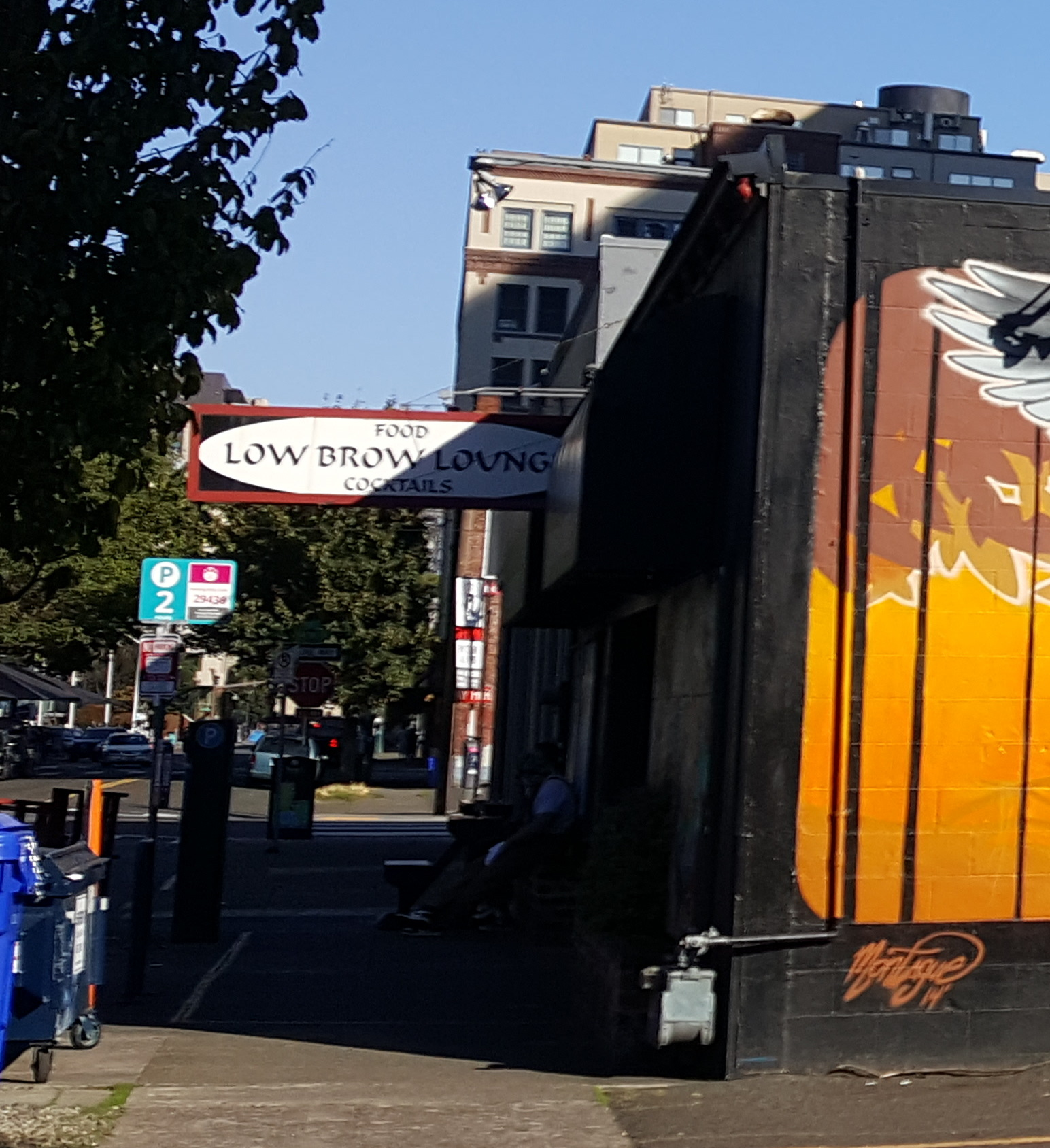
The bar's exterior in 2020

In 2016, readers of Willamette Week placed Low Brow third in the "Best Dive Bar" category in the annual "Best of Portland Reader's Poll". Readers named Low Brow runner-up in the same category in 2018.

In her 2019 article "Where to Eat and Drink in Portland's Pearl District" for Eater Portland, Kara Stokes wrote, "The Low Brow Lounge is a dark cave of a space that feels both wholly out of place and desperately needed in the posh Pearl, the kind of place ideal to hunker down in while it's raining... It's a dive bar through and through, somewhere to go for stiff cheap drinks and a tinge of old Pearl nostalgia, if not necessarily a dining destination." The website's Alex Frane and Alli Fodor included Low Brow Lounge in their guide to the city's "iconic" dive bars, writing, "A respite of low-brow dining in the otherwise bourgeoise Pearl District, the all-too-appropriately named Low Brow Lounge offers the cheapest drinks and most-fried food for blocks around. The multi-chambered diner and bar sports arcade games and quirky artwork, and each night sees regulars and service-workers coming in for an escape from the Pearl."

In his 2019 overview of Portland's "most essential" dive bars, Thrillist's Pete Cottell wrote, "With cheap-ish craft beer, dark, winding hallways, and above-average bites that rarely break the $10 mark, Low Brow Lounge succeeds at being the only comfortable place for a vast swath of Portland to grab a drink or two when forces beyond their control require them to spend some time in the Pearl District." He also included Low Brow in his 2019 list of the city's "best bars for single mingling".

== See also ==
- List of dive bars
