= Nite Hawk Cafe and Lounge =

Restaurant in Portland, Oregon, U.S.

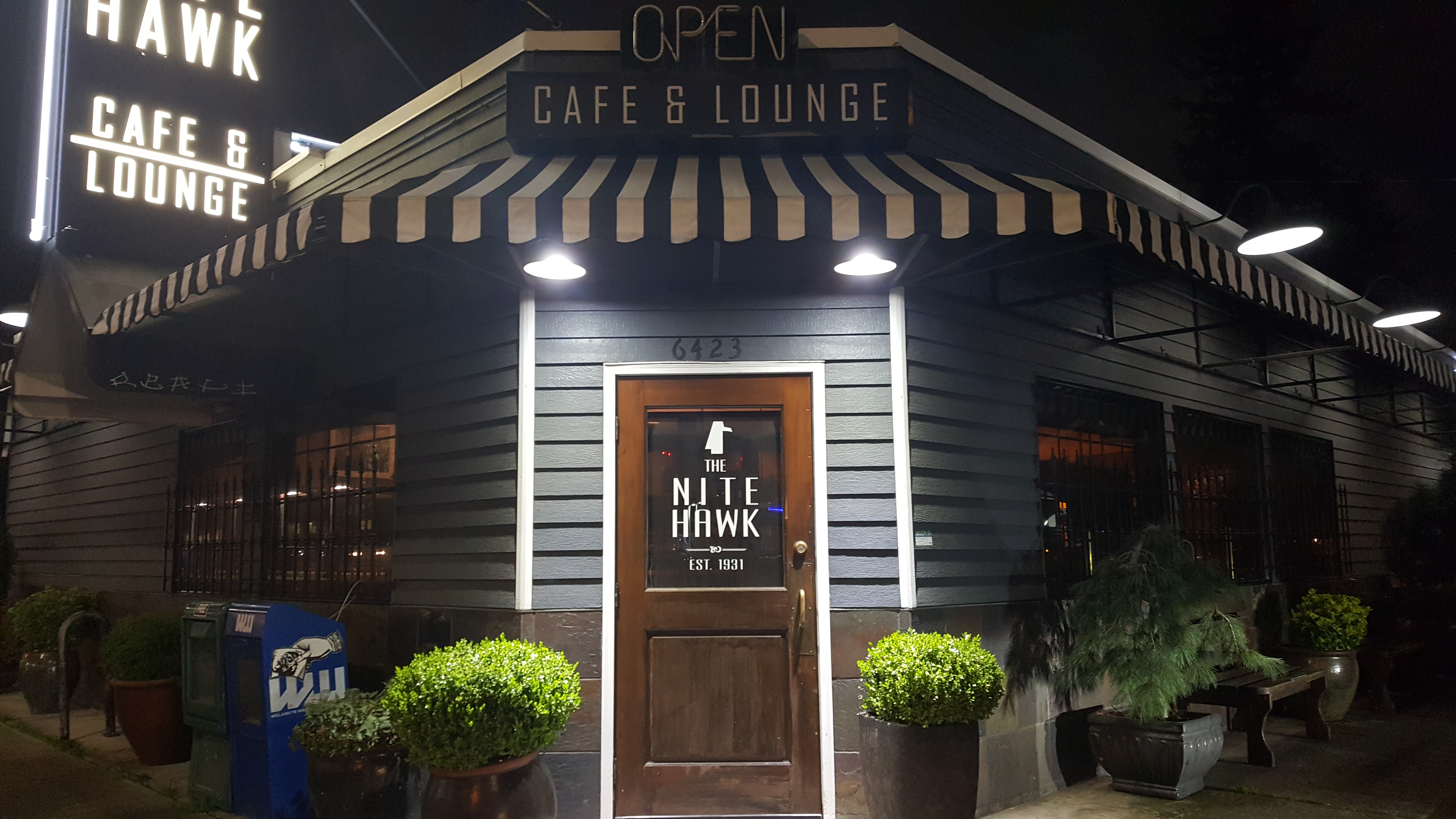
- The restaurant's exterior in 2022
- Interactive map of Nite Hawk Cafe and Lounge

Restaurant information
- Food type: American
- Location: 6423 North Interstate Avenue, Portland, Oregon, 97217, United States
- Coordinates: 45°34′10.3″N 122°40′57.2″W
- Website: thenitehawk.net

The Nite Hawk Cafe and Lounge is a restaurant in Portland, Oregon.

== Description ==
Nite Hawk serves breakfast all day. The menu includes chicken fried steak, rib eye steak and eggs, club sandwiches, and omelets with country fried potatoes. The diner's exterior has a neon sign.

== History ==
The business began offering oil changes and diner food in 1931, and has operated as a proper diner restaurant since 1980. Bill and Elaine Mildenberger owned the restaurant, as of 2003. Nite Hawk's exterior appeared in the television series Stumptown.

== Reception ==
Eater Portland included Nite Hawk in a 2016 list of Portland's 12 "iconic" greasy spoon breakfasts. Pete Cottell included the restaurant in Willamette Week's 2017 list of the city's 10 best "scumbag" breakfasts. He wrote, "Don't be fooled by the stylish sign the city bought the Nite Hawk after it tore up North Interstate Avenue to build the MAX line out front—this NoPo roadhouse feels more like the kind of place Clackistanis decked out in Realtree and Ducks gear would flock to on a Friday night than a hip diner within spitting distance of a New Seasons."

The Portland Mercury's 2017 overview of the city's dive bar brunches said, "Good coffee, an oldies station playing, and a worn-in, vintage feel to the place only add to the charm. It can get busy, but it's the perfect no-hassle, unfussy brunch, whatever the time of day." Michael Russell included Nite Hawk in The Oregonian's 2018 overview of "15 of our favorite remaining diners and diner-ish restaurants in the Portland area". In 2020, Taylor Rock and Dan Myers included Nite Hawk in The Daily Meal's list of "America's Greatest Old-School Restaurants".

== See also ==
- List of diners
- List of dive bars
