= List of dive bars =

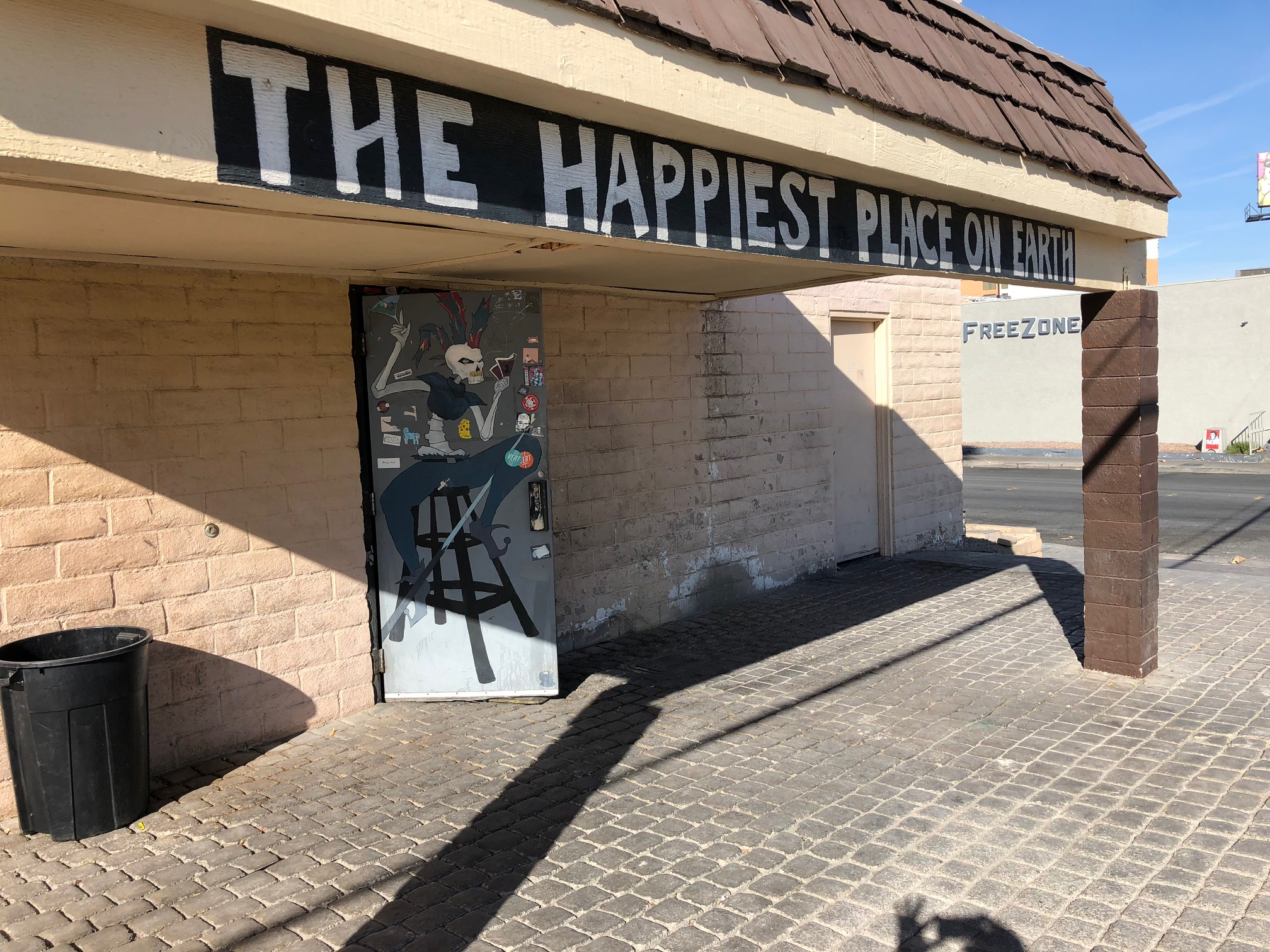
Double Down Saloon, Las Vegas

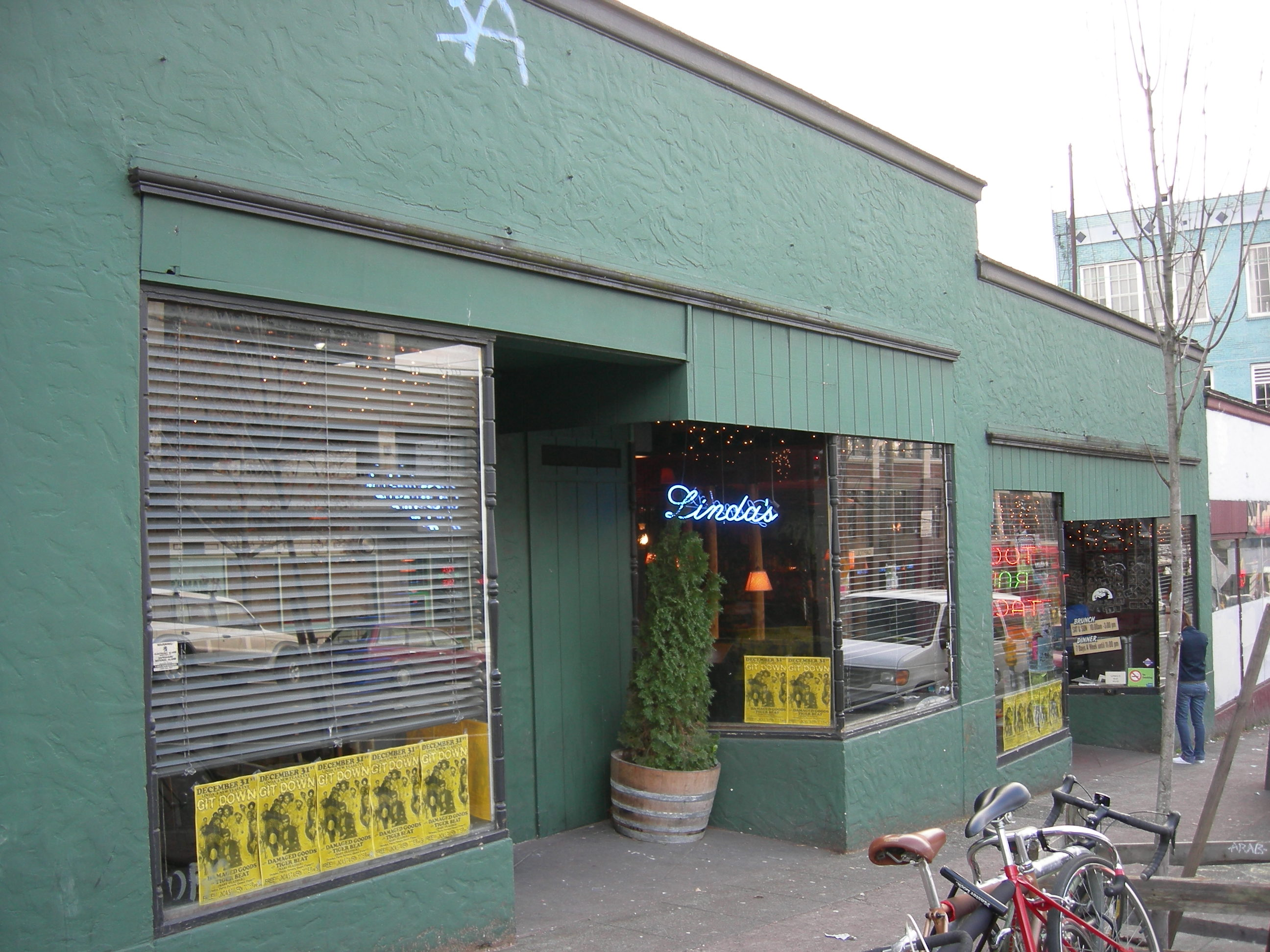
Linda's Tavern in Seattle, Washington

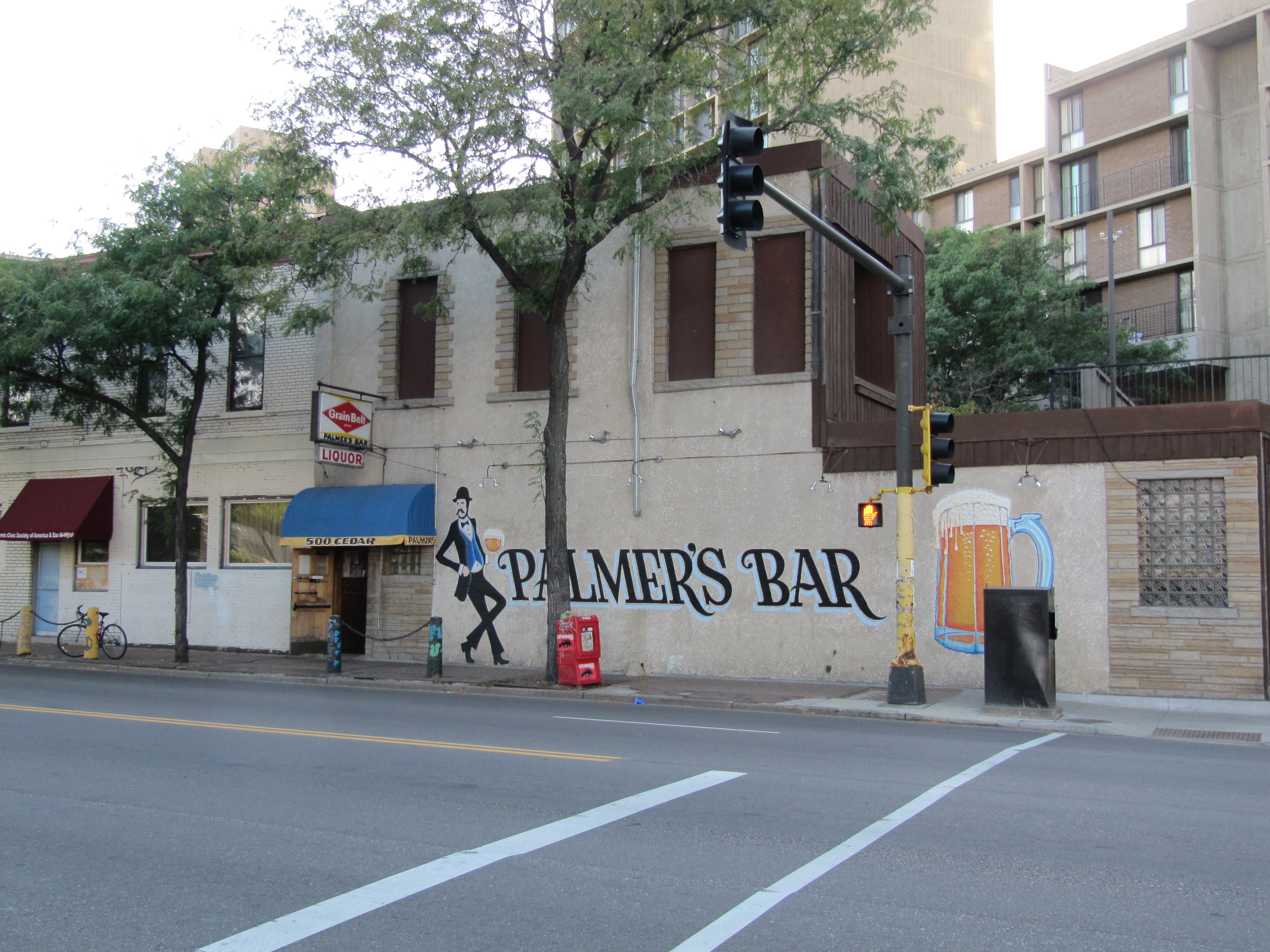
Palmer's Bar in Minneapolis, Minnesota

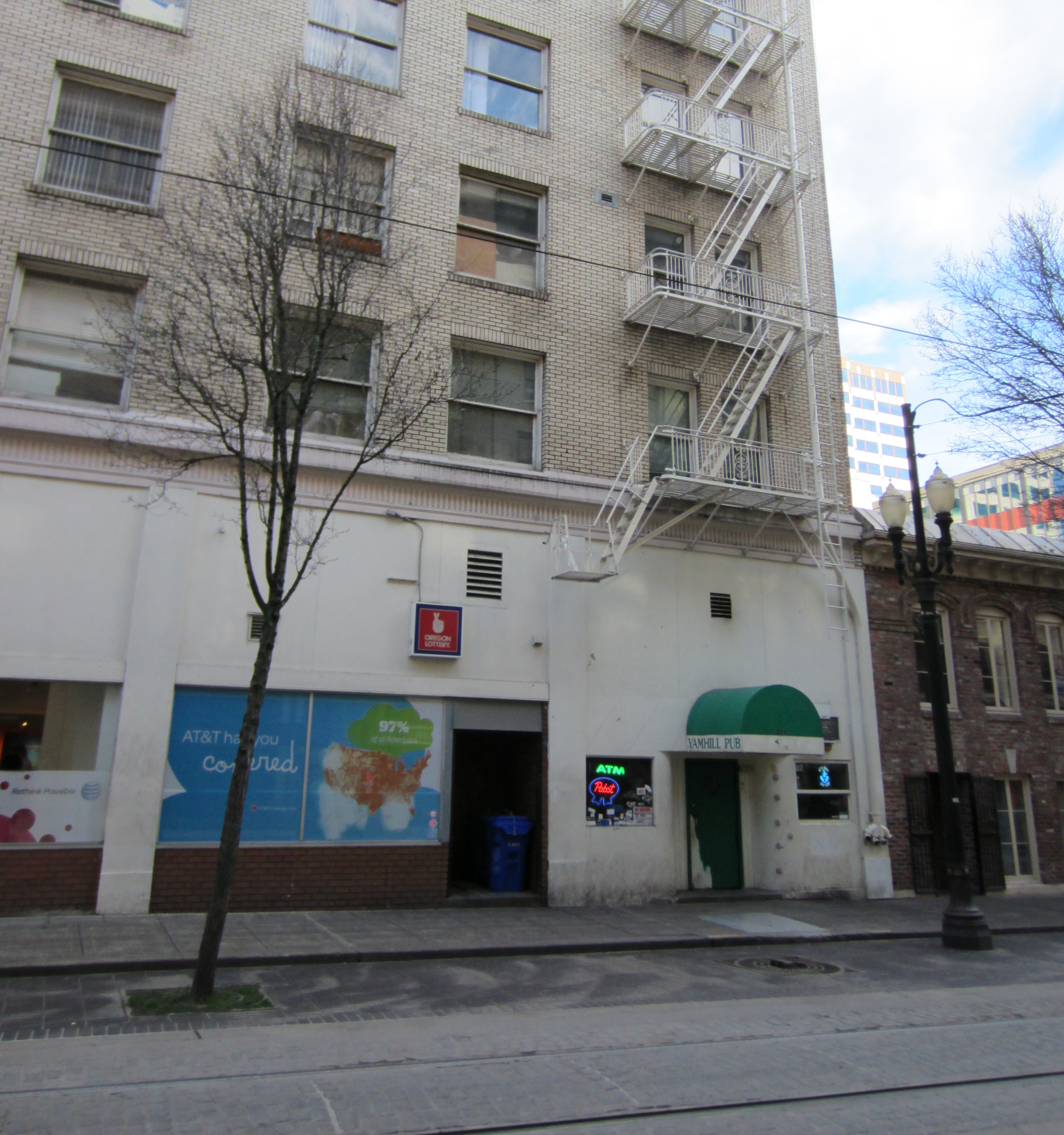
Yamhill Pub in Portland, Oregon

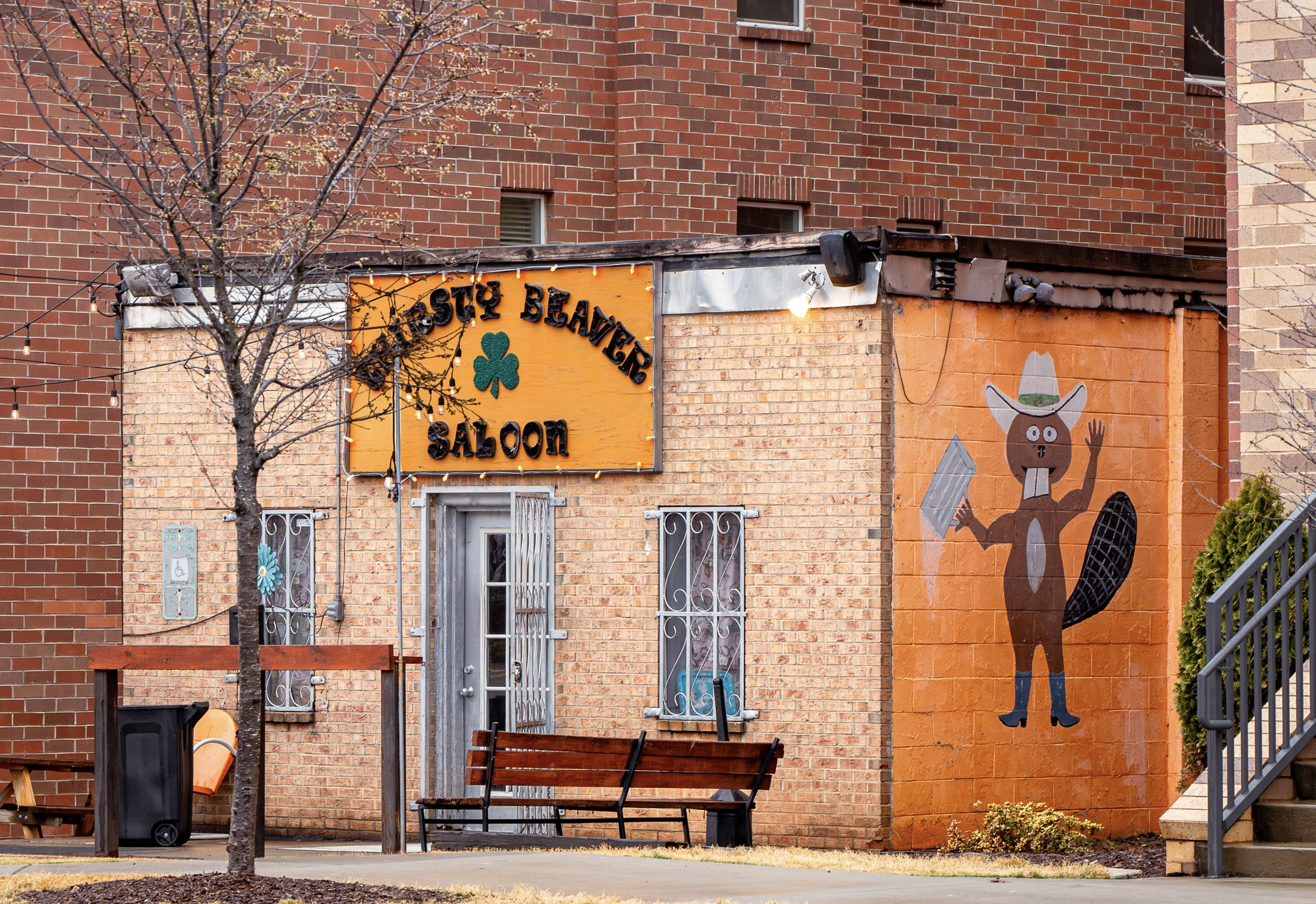
The Thirsty Beaver in Charlotte, North Carolina

While the definition of a "dive bar" varies, the following is a list of notable establishments which have been described as such. A dive bar is typically a small, unglamorous, eclectic, old-style drinking establishment with inexpensive drinks; it may feature dim lighting, shabby or dated decor, neon beer signs, packaged beer sales, cash-only service, and local clientele.

Establishment	Location	Ref.
The 19 Bar	Minneapolis, Minnesota	
The Riverside Inn	Cranford, New Jersey	
The 5 Point Cafe	Seattle, Washington	
Blue Moon Tavern	Seattle, Washington	
Bubba's Sulky Lounge	Portland, Maine	
Cafe Brass Monkey	Los Angeles, California	
Edinburgh Castle Pub	San Francisco, California	
El Chupacabra	Seattle, Washington	
Clermont Lounge	Atlanta, Georgia	
The Cock	New York City	
Comet Tavern	Seattle, Washington	
Creepy's	Portland, Oregon	
Dee's Cafe	Pittsburgh, Pennsylvania	
Dockside Saloon and Restaurant	Portland, Oregon	
Donnie Vegas	Portland, Oregon	
Double Down Saloon	Las Vegas, Nevada	
Dry Creek Café & Boat Dock	Austin, Texas	
Georgies	Asbury Park, New Jersey	
Frolic Room	Los Angeles, California	
Holman's Bar and Grill	Portland, Oregon	
Joe's Cellar	Portland, Oregon	
Kelly's Olympian	Portland, Oregon	
The Know	Portland, Oregon	
Linda's Tavern	Seattle, Washington	
Low Brow Lounge	Portland, Oregon	
Marie's Crisis	New York City	
The Matador	Portland, Oregon	
Mecca Cafe	Seattle, Washington	
Metropolitan	New York City	
My Father's Place	Portland, Oregon	
Nacho Borracho	Seattle, Washington	
Nick's Famous Coney Island	Portland, Oregon	
Nite Hawk Cafe and Lounge	Portland, Oregon	
Pal's Shanty Tavern	Portland, Oregon	
Palmer's Bar	Minneapolis, Minnesota	
Patty's Inn	San Jose, California	
Pink Feather	Portland, Oregon	
Reel M Inn	Portland, Oregon	
Shanghai Tunnel Bar	Portland, Oregon	
Ship Ahoy Tavern	Portland, Oregon	
Space Room Lounge and Genie's Too	Portland, Oregon	
Spare Room Restaurant and Lounge	Portland, Oregon	
Suki's	Portland, Oregon	
Thirsty Beaver	Charlotte, North Carolina	
Tom's Restaurant and Bar	Portland, Oregon	
Venice Tavern	Baltimore, Maryland	
Woodlawn Tap	Chicago, Illinois	
Yamhill Pub	Portland, Oregon	
Zach's Shack	Portland, Oregon	

== See also ==
- List of bars
- List of microbreweries
