= The Matador (bar) =

Defunct bar in Portland, Oregon, U.S.

- Location in Portland, Oregon
- Location: Portland, Oregon, United States
- Coordinates: 45.52322°N 122.69173°W

Construction
- Closed: September 12, 2014

The Matador was a bar in Portland, Oregon, United States.

== Description and history ==
The dive bar was established in 1971. It closed on September 12, 2014, after operating for more than forty years.

== See also ==
- List of dive bars
