= Mecca Cafe =

Diner and dive bar in Seattle, Washington, U.S.

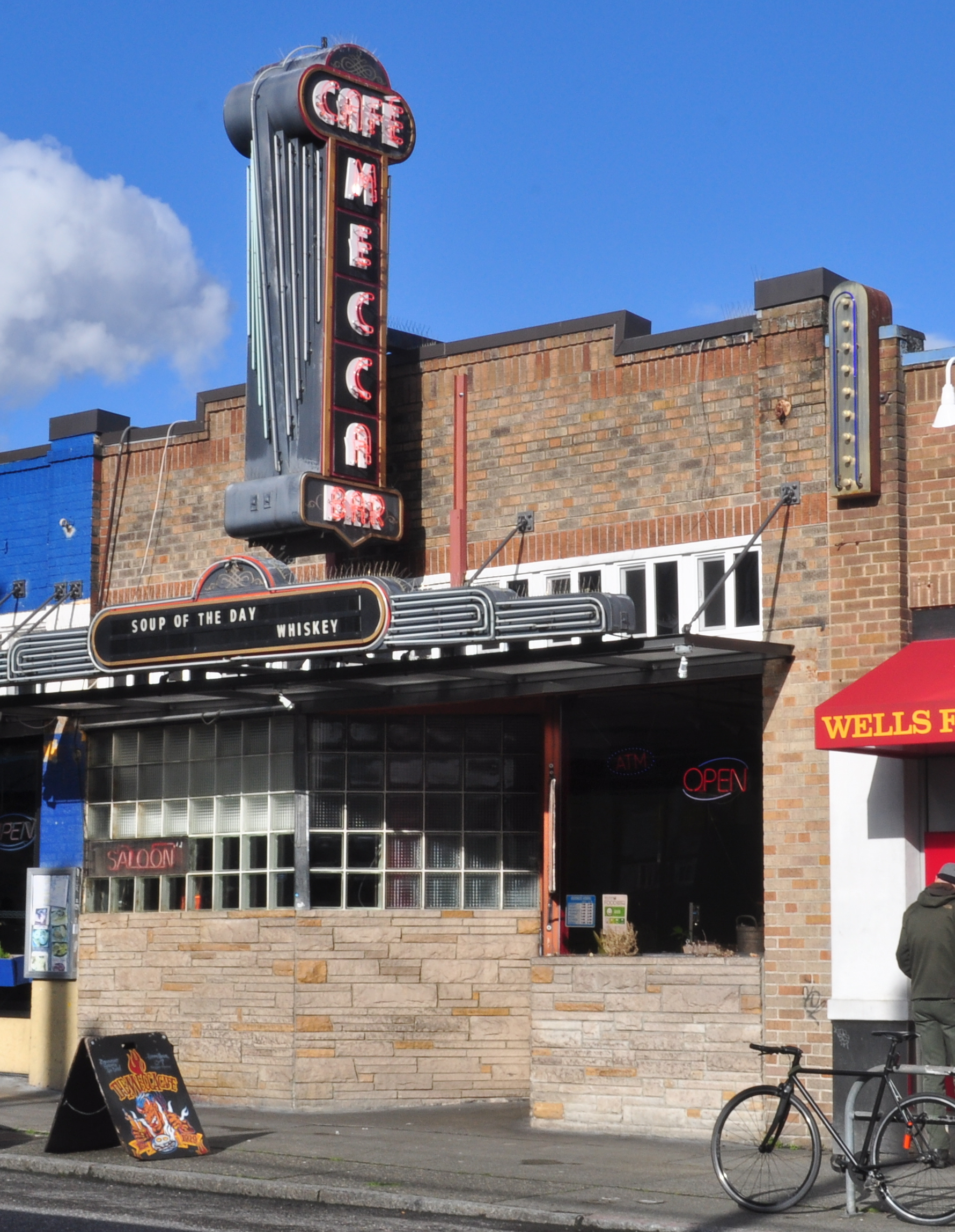
- The restaurant's exterior in 2018
- Interactive map of Mecca Cafe

Restaurant information
- Established: 1930
- Location: 526 Queen Anne Ave. N., Seattle, Washington, 98109, United States
- Coordinates: 47°37′26.7″N 122°21′23.6″W

Mecca Cafe is a restaurant in Seattle, in the U.S. state of Washington.

== Description ==
Mecca Cafe is a diner and dive bar in Seattle's Lower Queen Anne. The menu has included burgers and sandwiches. According to Lonely Planet, "Half of the long, skinny room at Mecca Café is a ketchup-on-the-table diner, but all the fun happens on the other side, where decades worth of beer mat scribbles line the walls and the bartenders know the jukebox songs better than you do."

== History ==
Mecca Cafe is among Seattle's oldest continuously operating bars. C. Preston and Frances Smith opened the restaurant in 1930. Mecca Cafe remained in the family until 2001. David Meinert later purchased the business.

== See also ==
- List of diners
- List of dive bars
