= Georgies =

Gay bar in Asbury Park, New Jersey

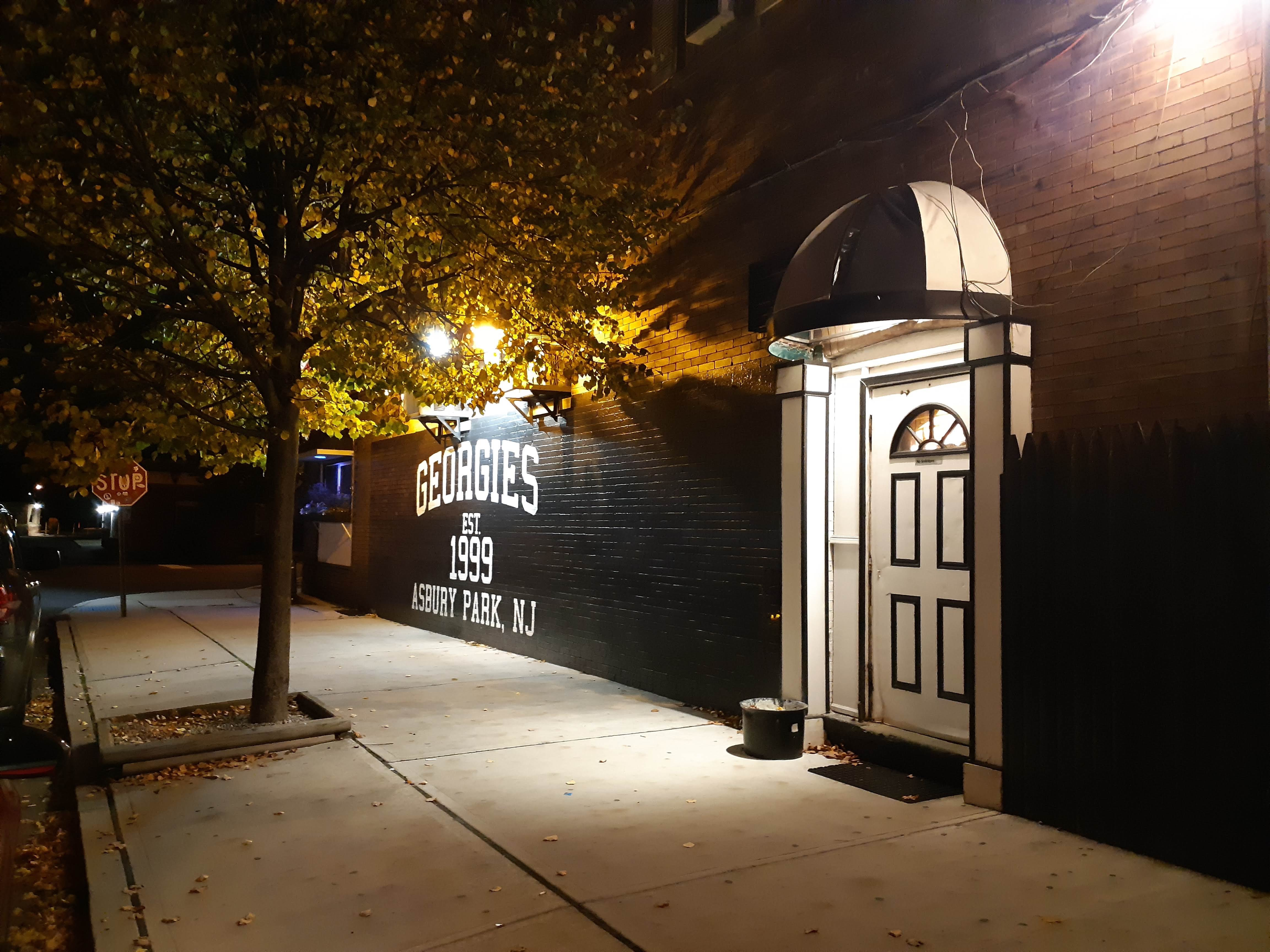
- Entrance to Georgies

- Location within Monmouth County, New Jersey
- Address: 810 5th Avenue
- Location: Asbury Park, New Jersey, US
- Coordinates: 40.2256°N 74.0127°W
- Operator: Joe Cole
- Type: Gay bar; dive bar
- Public transit: Asbury Park station

Construction
- Opened: 1999

Website
- georgiesbarap.com

Georgies, also spelled Georgie's, is a gay dive bar in Asbury Park, New Jersey. Opened in 1999, it is known colloquially as "the gay Cheers". In addition to static entertainment such as pool and sports match broadcasts, Georgies features live programs most nights; these include go-go dancing, karaoke and drag shows. The bar also hosts a variety of fundraisers to benefit the local community. Georgies closed for several months in early 2020 due to the COVID-19 pandemic, but it reopened for outdoor service in June and for limited indoor service in September of the same year. Critics note Georgies for its relaxed, non-judgmental atmosphere and its tight-knit community of regulars.

== Description ==
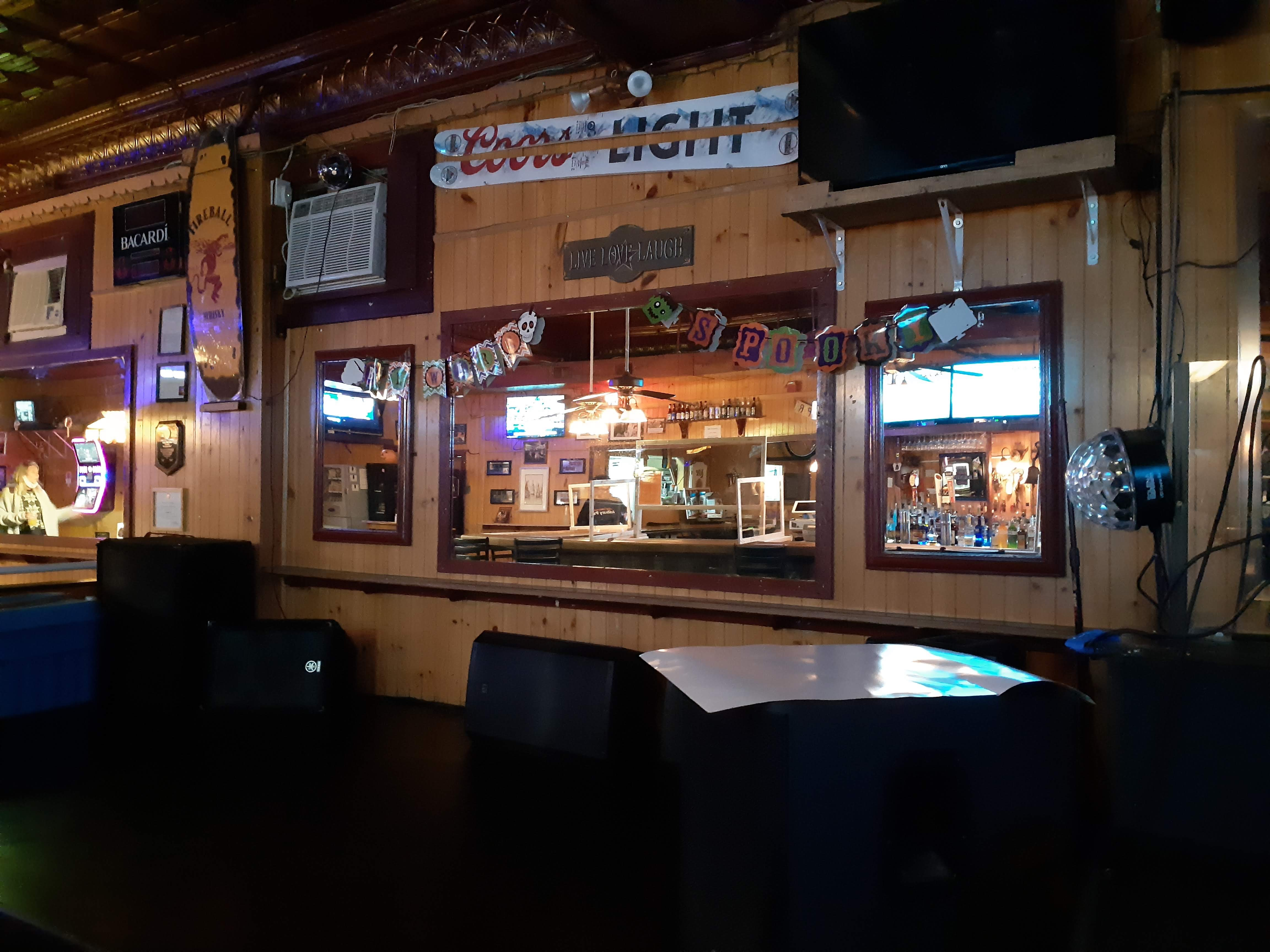
Stage area with the bar, outfitted with plastic dividers due to the COVID-19 pandemic, visible in the mirrors

Located on Fifth Avenue in Asbury Park, New Jersey, Georgies is a dive bar that caters to the LGBT community. It is known for its neighborly, accepting environment, for which reason it is nicknamed "the gay Cheers". Liz Dennerlein of the Asbury Park Press wrote: "[T]he tables are a bit run down, the bar still only accepts cash, but inside clients feel at home." Patrons vary widely in age, and staff estimate that approximately 75% of their customers are regulars. Managed by Joe Cole, the venue hosts live entertainment most nights. According to the Asbury Park Press, "Monday night features half-priced drinks and free pool. Tuesdays feature go-go boys at 10 p.m. Wednesdays feature a karaoke dance party. Thursday is drag night. Friday is beer pong night. Saturday is all-day karaoke." Georgies also broadcasts live sports matches, such as football games. The bar's pool table is particularly popular because few other establishments in Asbury Park have one.

== History ==
Georgies opened in 1999. In addition to its regular weekly programming, the bar has been the site of a number of larger events and fundraisers. During the holiday season of 1999, Georgies founded the Asbury Park Toy Drive for local children; the charity event subsequently grew into an annual, citywide undertaking. The bar regularly hosts Pride celebrations and afterparties for Asbury Park's yearly Pink Prom, which raises funds for the Ali Forney Center and for Project REAL, a local organization that supports gay and bisexual men. In the wake of the 2016 Pulse nightclub shooting in Orlando, Georgies implemented new security measures, including the use of a hand-held metal detector at the door. Additionally, municipal law enforcement increased its presence around all queer establishments in Asbury Park. The following year, Georgies held a benefit event in remembrance of the shooting, donating the proceeds of the evening to Project REAL.

Georgies was closed for several months in spring 2020 due to the COVID-19 pandemic, during which time its management revamped the space and "freshened up" its look. Still closed in early June, the bar hosted a live-streamed Pride party in lieu of its traditional in-person festivities. The establishment was able to reopen for outdoor service on its patio later that month. It resumed indoor service at 25% capacity in September, several weeks after Governor Phil Murphy announced that New Jersey bars and restaurants would be permitted to do so.

== Reception ==
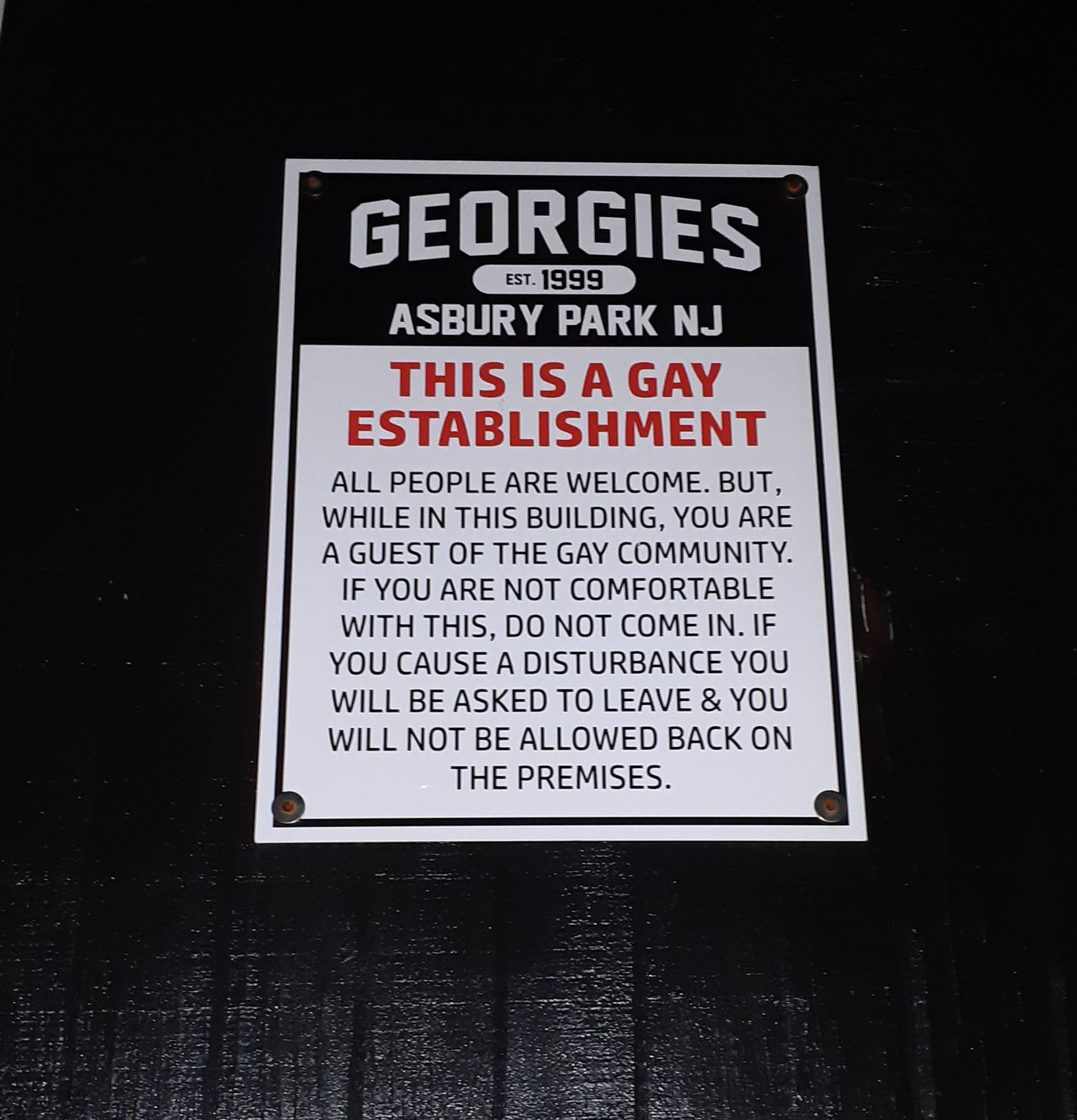
Sign outside the bar's entrance

In its 2018 article "All 47 bars in Asbury Park, ranked worst to best", NJ.com listed Georgies in 20th place with the following comment:

While Georgies, the enduring, wood-paneled and cash-only dive on Fifth Avenue, is known as the city's neighborhood gay bar ... it really is a spot for all, with welcoming staff and patrons, TVs to watch the game and a pool table. More importantly, Georgies ... is one of the last places in Asbury Park that still touts real dive bar prices. If you need a cheap, cold beer and maybe a laugh, go to Georgies.

A 2015 Asbury Park Press article stated: "The bar has become more than just a hangout spot—it's become a space where people can be themselves without judgement." In a review of "the 11 best bars in Asbury Park", Courtney Marabella of the Press ranked Georgies seventh and called it "the best dive bar in the city". She further commented: "It has labeled itself the 'gay cheers', and I have to admit, it's the truth (I know the names of most of the regulars). They serve a strong drink ... and are an excellent watering hole for the LGBTQ community and beyond."

== See also ==
- History of the LGBTQ+ community in Asbury Park
- List of dive bars
