= Marie's Crisis =

Piano bar and gay bar in New York City, US

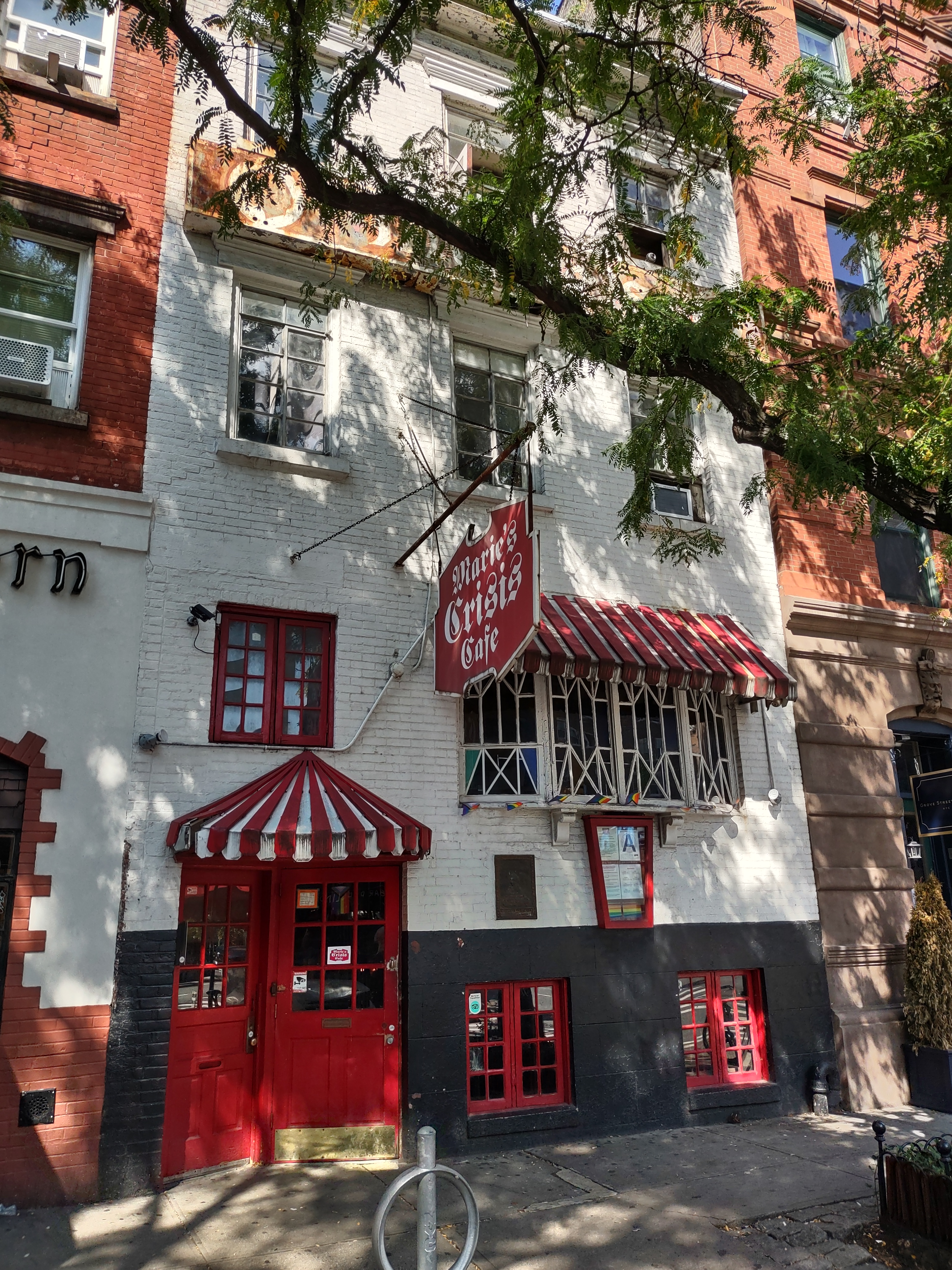
- Marie's Crisis venue in 2023.
- Interactive map of Marie's Crisis
- Address: 59 Grove Street
- Location: West Village, New York, United States
- Coordinates: 40.7332°N 74.0036°W
- Owner: The Grant Family
- Type: Gay bar; Piano bar; Dive bar
- Public transit: Christopher Street station (PATH); West Fourth Street–Washington Square station

Construction
- Built: 1839
- Opened: 1929

Website
- www.mariescrisiscafe.com

Marie's Crisis Cafe is a piano bar and gay bar located at 59 Grove Street in the West Village of New York City. Constructed on the site of Thomas Paine's home, the location originally served as a brothel before gradually transitioning to a bar. By the early 1970s, the bar had become an established presence in the West Village for the nascent gay community and, over time, also became a popular piano bar. Today, the bar is known for its boisterous sing-along culture and popularity among Broadway industry participants and fans.

== History ==
The bar occupies the same location as Thomas Paine's former residence and the location where he died. The building currently occupied by the bar was constructed in 1838 and originally served as a brothel and boarding house. By the 1890s, the establishment had become an early gay bar (referred to at the time as a "boy bar"). In 1929, the bar was acquired by Marie DuMont and renamed "Marie's". The word "Crisis" in the bar's name is an acknowledgment to Thomas Paine's The American Crisis.

At some point in the mid-20th century, the bar acquired a Works Progress Administration glass etching of the American and French revolutions that now sits behind the bar. In 1972, the Grant family acquired the bar.

== Current operations ==
Today, the bar is a notable gay bar and sing-along piano bar. The bar is particularly popular with fans of Broadway musicals and industry professionals.

== In media ==
Marie's Crisis has been featured in several television programs including The Politician, High Maintenance, and Younger. The cafe also appears in the 1950 film noir Side Street.

== See also ==
- List of dive bars
