= Edinburgh Castle Pub =

Defunct dive bar in San Francisco, California, U.S.

- Interactive map of Edinburgh Castle Pub

Restaurant information
- Location: San Francisco, California, United States
- Coordinates: 37.78624°N 122.41898°W

Edinburgh Castle Pub was a dive bar in San Francisco, California, United States. It closed permanently in 2025.

Edinburgh Castle offered cue sports and dartboards. The menu included fish and chips as well as haggis. The bar hosted trivia and was described as an "institution".

== See also ==
- List of defunct restaurants of the United States
- List of dive bars
