= Venice Tavern =

Dive bar in Baltimore, Maryland

- Location within Baltimore

Restaurant information
- Established: 1933
- Owner: Dominic DeSantis
- Location: 339 S Conkling St, Baltimore, Maryland
- Coordinates: 39°17′15.9″N 76°34′01.4″W

Venice Tavern is a dive bar in the Highlandtown neighborhood of Baltimore, Maryland. The bar opened in 1933, when Frank Sr and Victoria DeSantis converted their basement and added an exterior staircase to access it from outside of their Conkling Street row house. The 3-story mansion above the bar was originally built in 1920 for William Schluderberg of C., a member of the William Schluderberg & Son meat packing family, and now houses a local and organic farmers market store.

== History ==
Established in 1933, just after the repeal of prohibition, a portrait of then-president Franklin Delano Roosevelt behind the bar continues to pay tribute to Venice's founding history. Venice was established by Italian immigrants Frank and Mary Victoria DeSantis Sr., and while Mary hailed from Naples in Southern Italy, her love of Venice gave the bar its name.

At the time of the bar's founding, Highlandtown was home to working-class Polish, German and Italian families, and the simple, affordable (at 15 cents) beer offerings reflected the tastes of the neighborhood. Venice was run by the husband-wife duo for three decades. Frank Sr. died in 1962, and Mary ran the bar herself until her own death in 1967, after which control passed to their two sons, Frank Jr. and Vince DeSantis. Frank DeSantis Jr. turned the bar over to his son Dominic DeSantis in 2006. While not changing the aesthetic character of the bar, Dominic acknowledged shifts in the composition of the neighborhood and tastes, introducing various craft beers to the taps at Venice, but keeping the low prices which had made it locally notable. In recent years, Venice has participated in various tap takeovers and regional craft brewery features. It has also been a featured stop on annual walking tours during Baltimore Beer Week.

The success of Venice eventually allowed the DeSantis family to expand bar or restaurant operations to Little Italy (Venice Tavern Little Italy, formerly Dego Dames), Canton (Hudson Street Stackhouse) and Perry Hall (DeSantis Pizza Grill & Bar).

== Accolades ==
Despite its small size, Venice has received frequent write ups and recommendations in local, regional and national publications as a surviving example of the archetypal Baltimore corner bar.

Baltimore City Paper dubbed Venice the "Craft Beer Underground," due to the combination of its low prices and trendier craft beers. They also named it their "Best Dive Bar" in both their 2011 & 2017 Best of Baltimore lists. Tasting Table listed it nationally as one of "The Best Dive Bars in the U.S." in 2017. The budget price of its taps remains one of Venice's most notable aspects, often in contrast to bars in neighboring Canton, Brewers Hill and Fell's Point, with Highlandtown Main Street claiming it "offers, very possibly, the most inexpensive craft beer in the state." In opposition to what he saw as a rising trend of $6 beers, City Paper's Baynard Woods described Venice as "the bulwark against the brave new world where we are all willing to pay too much to get our buzz on just because."

Visitors and reviewers frequently comment on Venice's decor, which consists largely of dozens of boxing promotion posters and photographs from decades past, reflecting a time when boxing was a much more popular sport. Former co-owner Vince DeSantis was himself Highlandtown lightweight boxing champion in 1931, and maintains a listing in the Maryland Boxing Hall of Fame.

In a period of Baltimore's history where historic corner bars are frequently closing, Venice has drawn comment in spite of rapid and multiple demographic changes in the surrounding Highlandtown neighborhood, for remaining a fixture of the community and adapting to accommodate people of a variety of origins.

== See also ==
- List of dive bars
