= Holman's Bar and Grill =

Restaurant in Portland, Oregon, U.S.

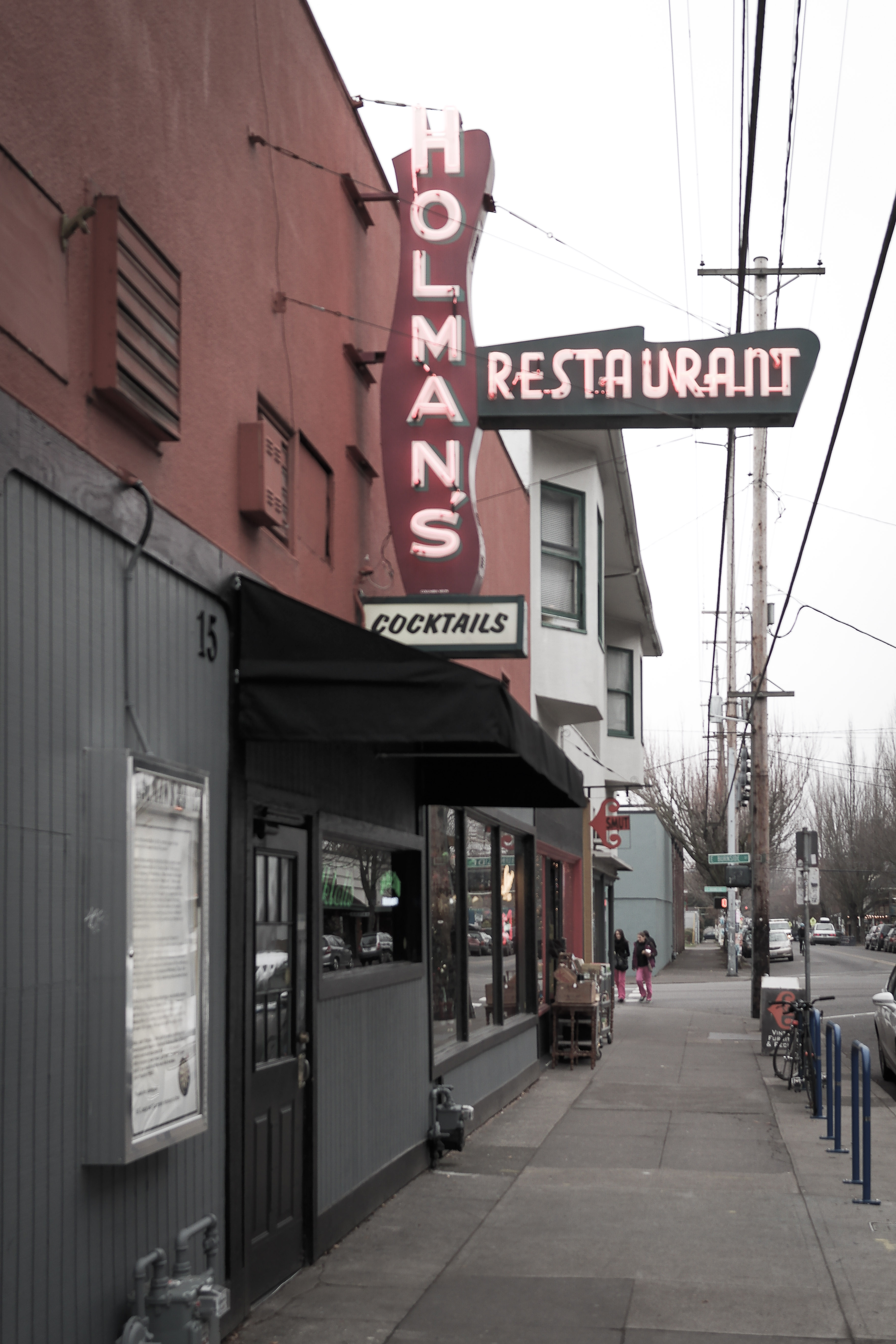
- The restaurant's exterior in 2013
- Interactive map of Holman's Bar and Grill

Restaurant information
- Established: 1933
- Owner: Judy Craine
- Location: 15 Southeast 28th Avenue, Portland, Multnomah, Oregon, 97214, United States
- Coordinates: 45.5226°N 122.6374°W

Holman's Bar and Grill, also known as Holman's Restaurant or simply Holman's, is a bar and restaurant in Portland, Oregon, United States.

== Description ==
Located at the intersection of 28th Avenue and Burnside Street in southeast Portland's Buckman neighborhood (at the Kerns boundary), Holman's has been described by Jennifer Anderson of the Portland Tribune as a "neighborhood burger joint". The bar has a "free meal wheel", allowing patrons a chance to dine at no cost. Pinball is available.

Holman's has a DIY Bloody Mary bar; other menu options include chicken fried steak, hamburger sliders, fried macaroni and cheese bites, and the Peanut Butter Bacon Burger. Eggs, bacon, hash browns, and potatoes O'Brien are offered for brunch.

== History ==
The business was established in 1933. Judy Craine became the owner in 1976.

In 2020, when the business was forced to close temporarily because of the COVID-19 pandemic, a handwritten sign saying "Booze is all gone" was displayed in the window.

Warren Boothby and Marcus Archambeault purchased Holman's from Bill Craine. The bar reopened on July 31, 2023.

== Reception ==
In 2016, Eater Portland included Holman's in a list of "Portland's 25 Oldest Restaurants Worth Checking Out", and Alex Frane of Thrillist included the business in "Portland's Cocktail Bucket List: The 50 Drinks to Try Before You Die". Frane described Holman's as "a classic Portland dive" and highlighted the Bloody Mary bar. Pete Cottell included the "quick-start special" in a 2017 list of "Portland's 10 Best Scumbag Breakfasts".

== See also ==
- List of dive bars
