= Joe's Cellar =

Diner and dive bar in Portland, Oregon, U.S.

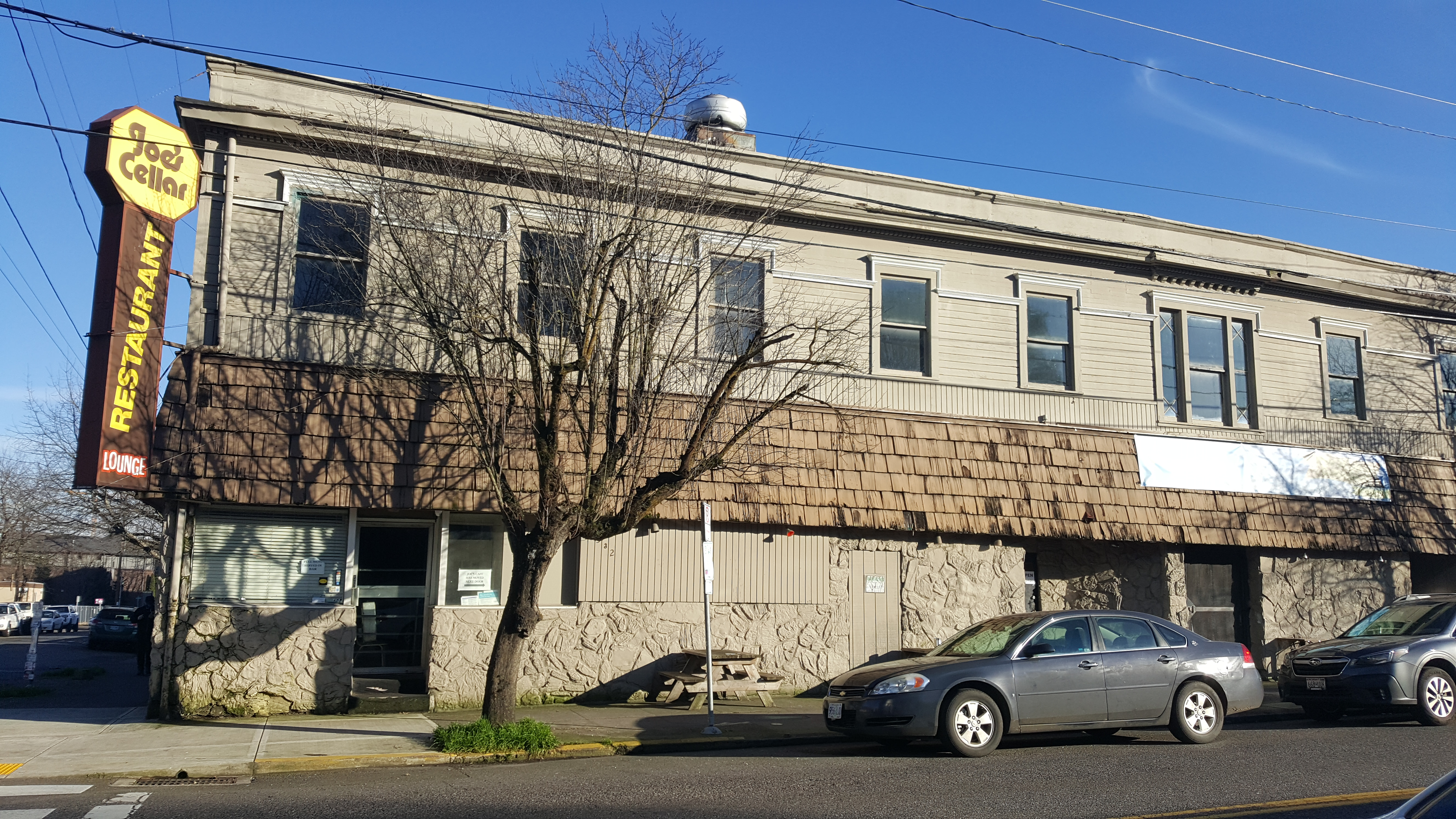
- The bar's exterior in 2022
- Interactive map of Joe's Cellar

Restaurant information
- Established: 1941
- Location: 1332 Northwest 21st Avenue, Portland, Multnomoah, Oregon, 97209, United States
- Coordinates: 45.5326°N 122.6945°W

Joe's Cellar is a diner and dive bar in northwest Portland, Oregon. Former names include Nimar Cafe, the Dinner Bell, the Ace of Diamonds, and the Smoke Stack.

== Description ==
Portland Monthly has described the Northwest District business as "a classic Portland dive bar with unmatched longevity". In 2021, Willamette Week said, "Dive bars are generally good places to hide from the sun, but Joe's Cellar seems designed to make you forget sunlight exists. It's windowless and mostly lit by the glow of lottery machines, TVs and neon beer signs. And there's always a sweaty tallboy waiting for you behind the bar."

== History ==
Established in 1941, the business closed temporarily for repairs in 2013.

== Reception ==
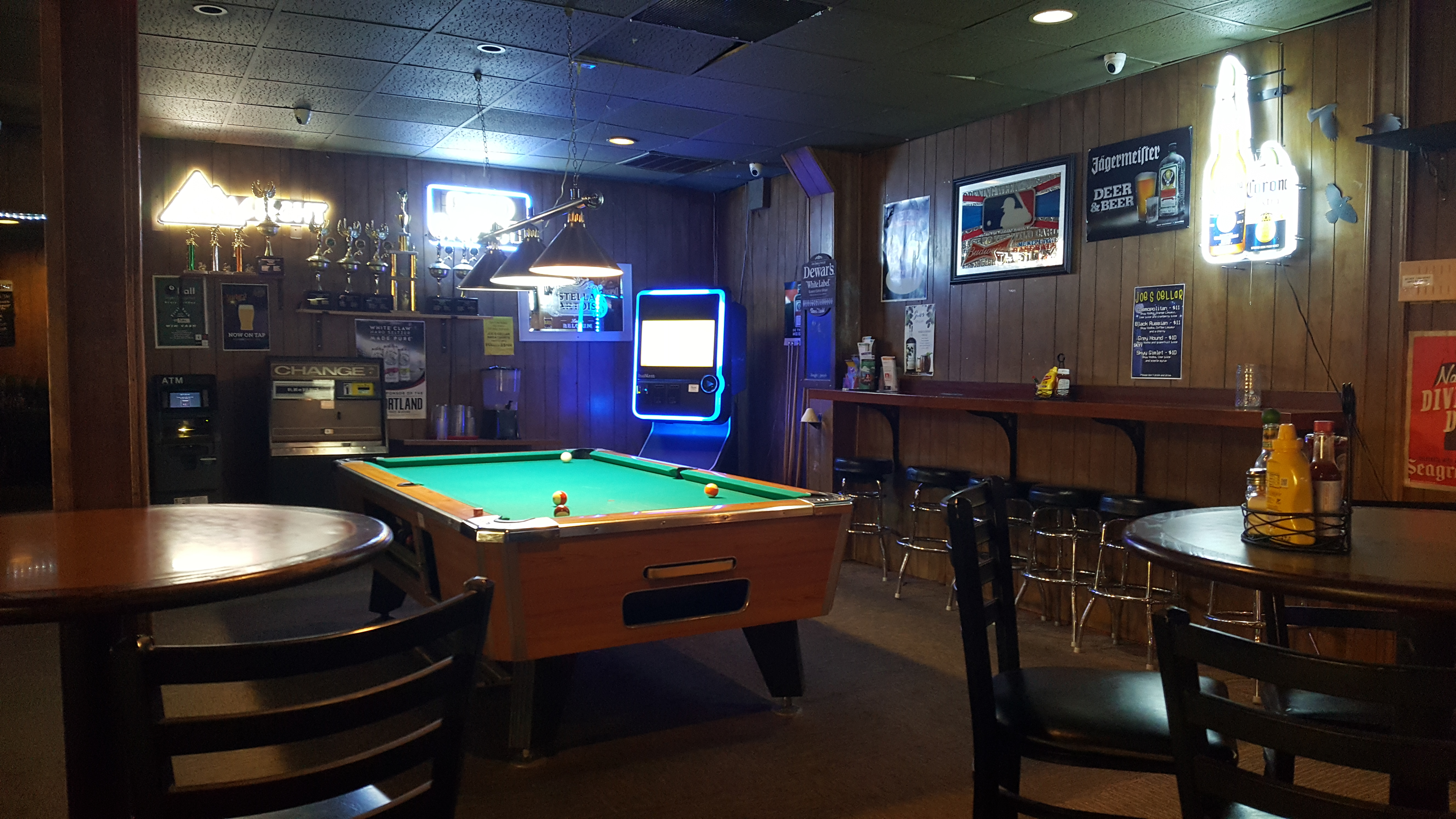
The bar's interior, 2022

In his 2017 overview of "Portland's 10 Best Scumbag Breakfasts", Pete Cottell of Willamette Week wrote, "No amount of cheap eggs and ham steaks covered in flat-top ashes can overcome the lingering pee smell and disorienting windowlessness that makes Joe's what it is. Not to mention, the sad $7.50 breakfast of eggs, toast, hash browns and bacon wasn't even cheap. The food is best ignored unless you show up before 10 and opt for the $3 "working man" special of biscuits and gravy with a coffee." In 2018, The Oregonian's Grant Butler included Joe's Cellar in an overview of "30 great Portland bars that are still going strong".

== See also ==
- List of dive bars
