= Cafe Brass Monkey =

Dive bar and restaurant in Koreatown, Los Angeles, CA

Restaurant information
- Established: 1971
- Location: 3440 Wilshire Blvd, Koreatown, Los Angeles, Los Angeles, California, United States
- Coordinates: 34°3′41.7414″N 118°17′56.511″W
- Website: https://www.cafebrassmonkey.com/

Cafe Brass Monkey, also known as the Brass Monkey, is a karaoke dive bar and restaurant in the Koreatown neighborhood of Los Angeles, California.

== Overview ==
Opened in 1971, the Brass Monkey is a ski lodge style dive bar, described by the Los Angeles Times as "arguably L.A.'s best feel-good karaoke bar." The bar is frequented by industry players and celebrities such as: Margaret Cho, Matt Damon, Ben Affleck, John Mayer, Manny Pacquiao, Ben Stiller and Courtney Cox. The Brass Monkey has been described as Seth McFarlane's hangout choice and karaoke spot to sing Frank Sinatra.

As of November 2022, owner Alan Spear has run the Brass Monkey for more than three decades, and was regarded as "L.A. karaoke royalty" by the Los Angeles Times.

== Reception ==
The Brass Monkey has featured on several lists from publications like Los Angeles Magazine's "The 5 Coolest Karaoke Bars in L.A." (2022), LA Weekly's "The 10 Best Bars in Los Angeles" (2017), and Thrillist's "10 best karaoke bars in LA" (2014), including being described by the LA Times as a "Feel-Good-Favorite."

== See also ==
- List of dive bars
- Wilshire Center (neighborhood)
