= Spare Room Restaurant and Lounge =

Restaurant in Portland, Oregon, U.S.

- The Spare Room
- Logo

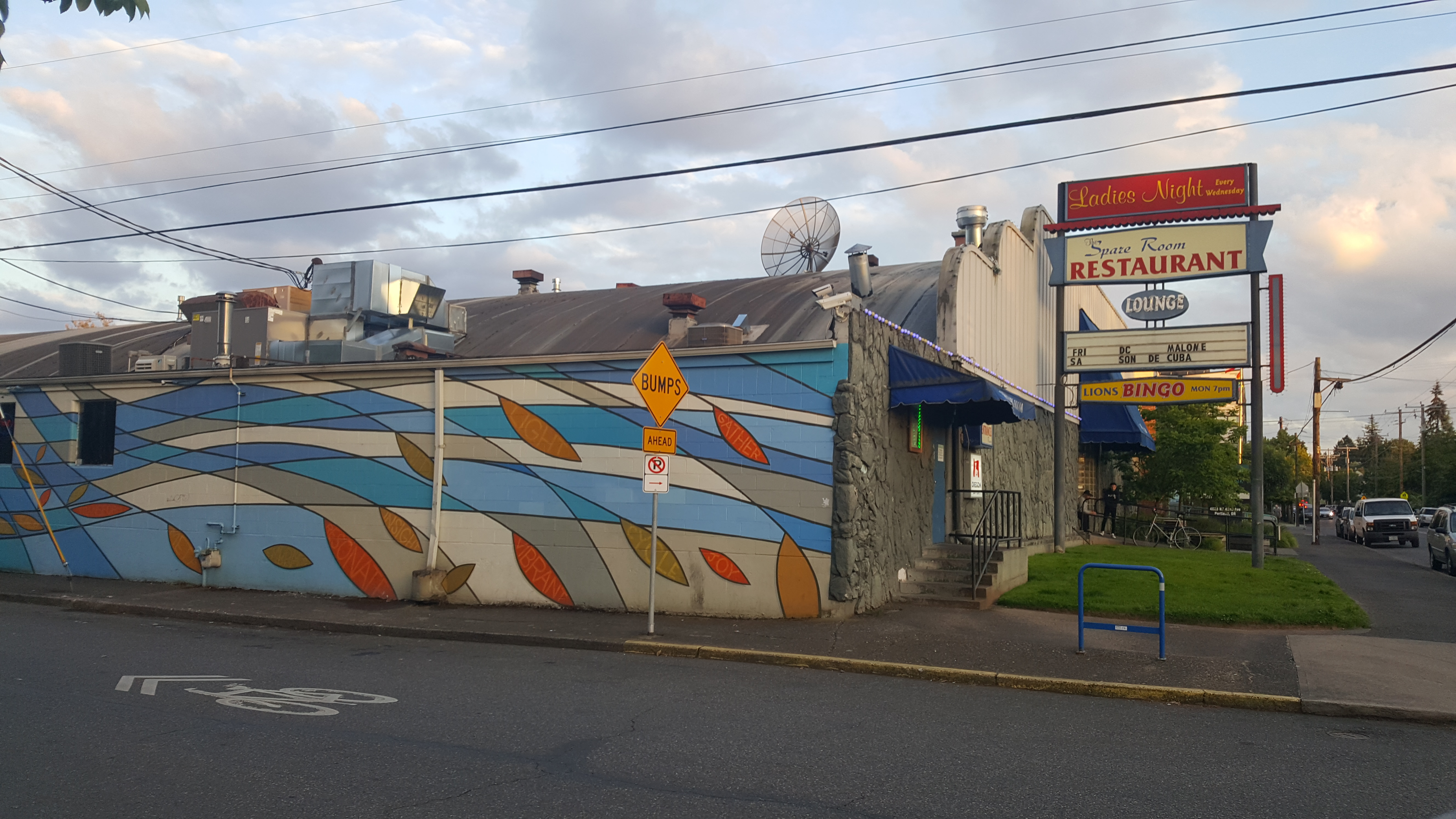
- The restaurant's exterior, 2022
- Interactive map of Spare Room Restaurant and Lounge
- Address: 4830 Northeast 42nd Avenue
- Location: Portland, Oregon, U.S.
- Coordinates: 45°33′29.1″N 122°37′12.7″W

Construction
- Opened: 1977

Website
- spareroomrestaurantandlounge.com

Spare Room Restaurant and Lounge, or simply The Spare Room, is a dive bar, restaurant, and entertainment venue in northeast Portland, Oregon, United States.

== Description and history ==
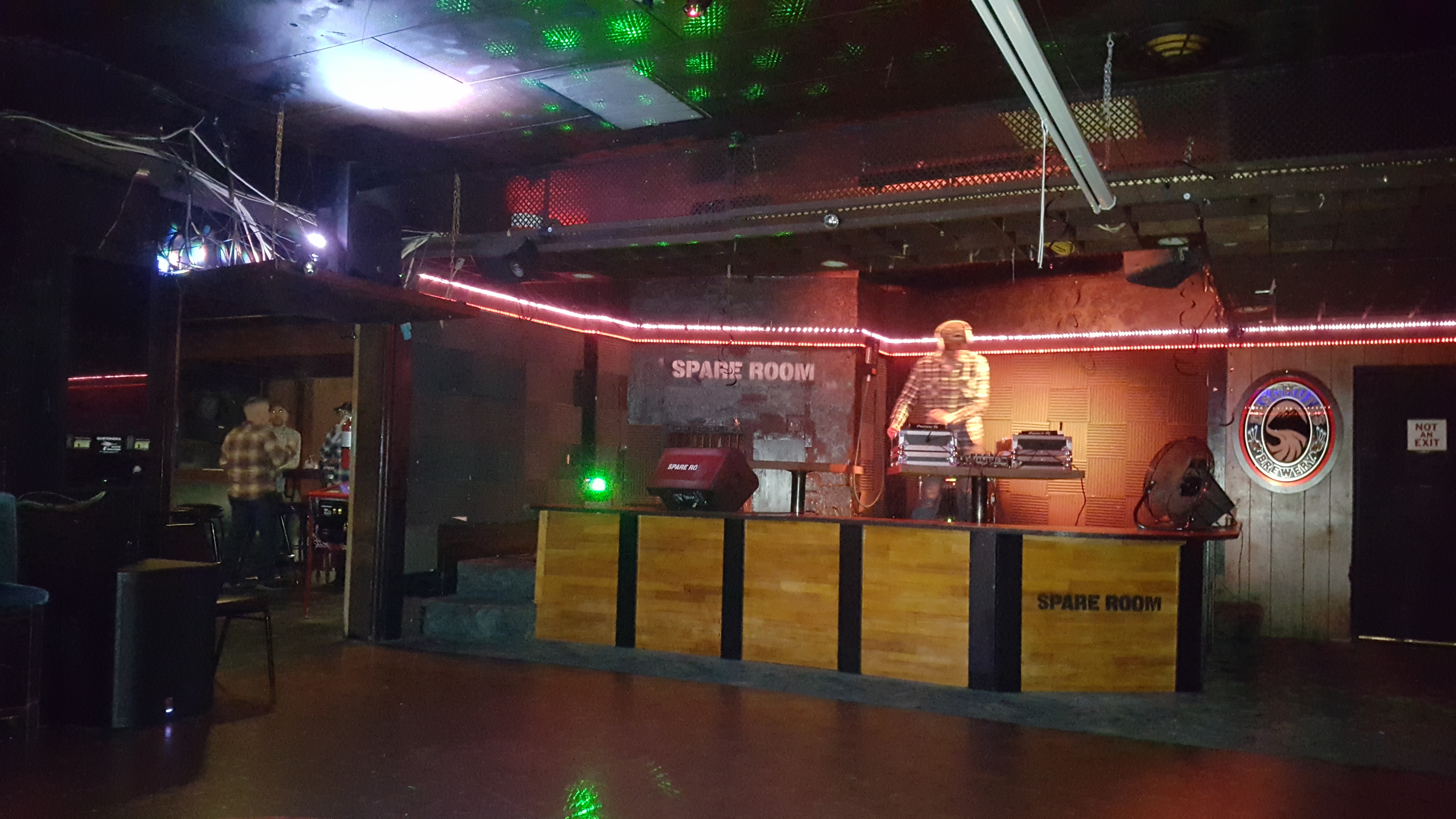
Dance floor

The Spare Room is a restaurant and entertainment venue with two bars in northeast Portland's Cully neighborhood, established in 1977 in a former bowling alley. The restaurant's daily menu features standard pub food and classic American cuisine for breakfast, lunch, and dinner.

The space has a large dance floor and hosts a variety of events, such as bingo for seniors, country–western dances, karaoke, and hard and indie rock concerts. The Spare Room hosts a monthly event called "the Get Down", described by Willamette Week as a "soul, funk and R&B dance party that's almost too popular", as of 2018. The venue also hosts "Sugar Town", described as one of the city's "most established inclusive dance nights" featuring a disc jockey who specializes in blues and soul music.

== Reception ==
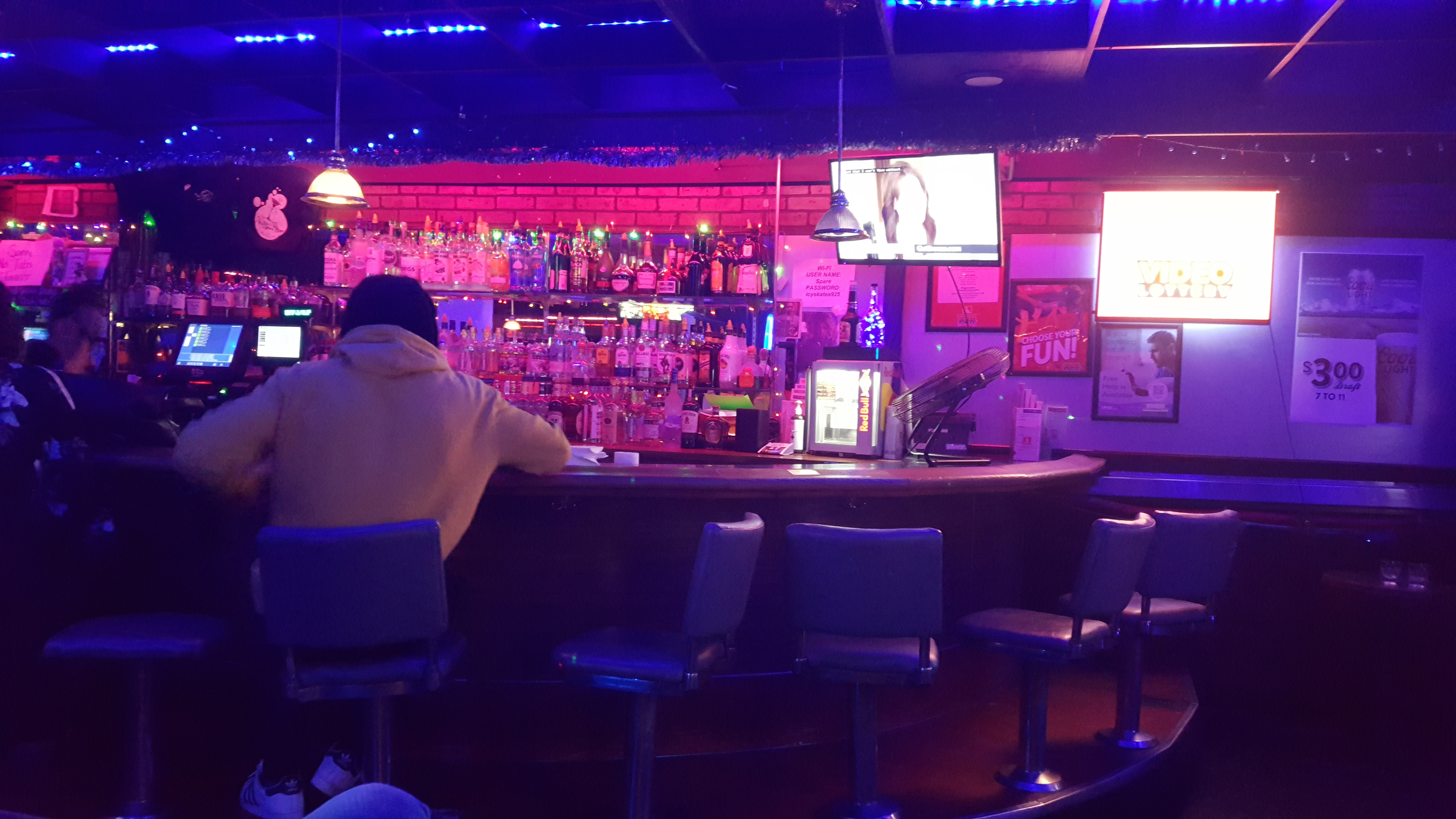
Interior bar, 2022

The Spare Room was included in Portland Monthly's 2014 list of "Portland's Best Bars of the Moment". In her 2016 overview of restaurants along Northeast 42nd Avenue in Cully, The Portland Mercury's Andrea Damewood described the venue as a place "where the magic happens" with "a hell of a karaoke setup".

In 2018, Willamette Week described the venue as "an Old Portland icon that stands as the antithesis of New Portland's bougie homogeneity", with dim lights and inexpensive drinks. The paper's Donovan Farley wrote, "The food is typical bar fare with a homey twist – think meatloaf and spaghetti dinners... Like a chilled-out and boozy Waffle House, the Spare Room also serves breakfast daily at 7 am, making it the rare establishment that's a great place to begin and end your day, provided you can do so while remaining employed." Willamette Week also included the venue's "live-band karaoke experience", called "Karaoke from Hell", on their 2018 list of Portland's "best places to sing karaoke", and the "Sugar Town" event in their list of the city's most "queer-centric" dance parties.

== See also ==
- Culture of Portland, Oregon
- List of dive bars
