= Metropolitan (bar) =

New York gay bar

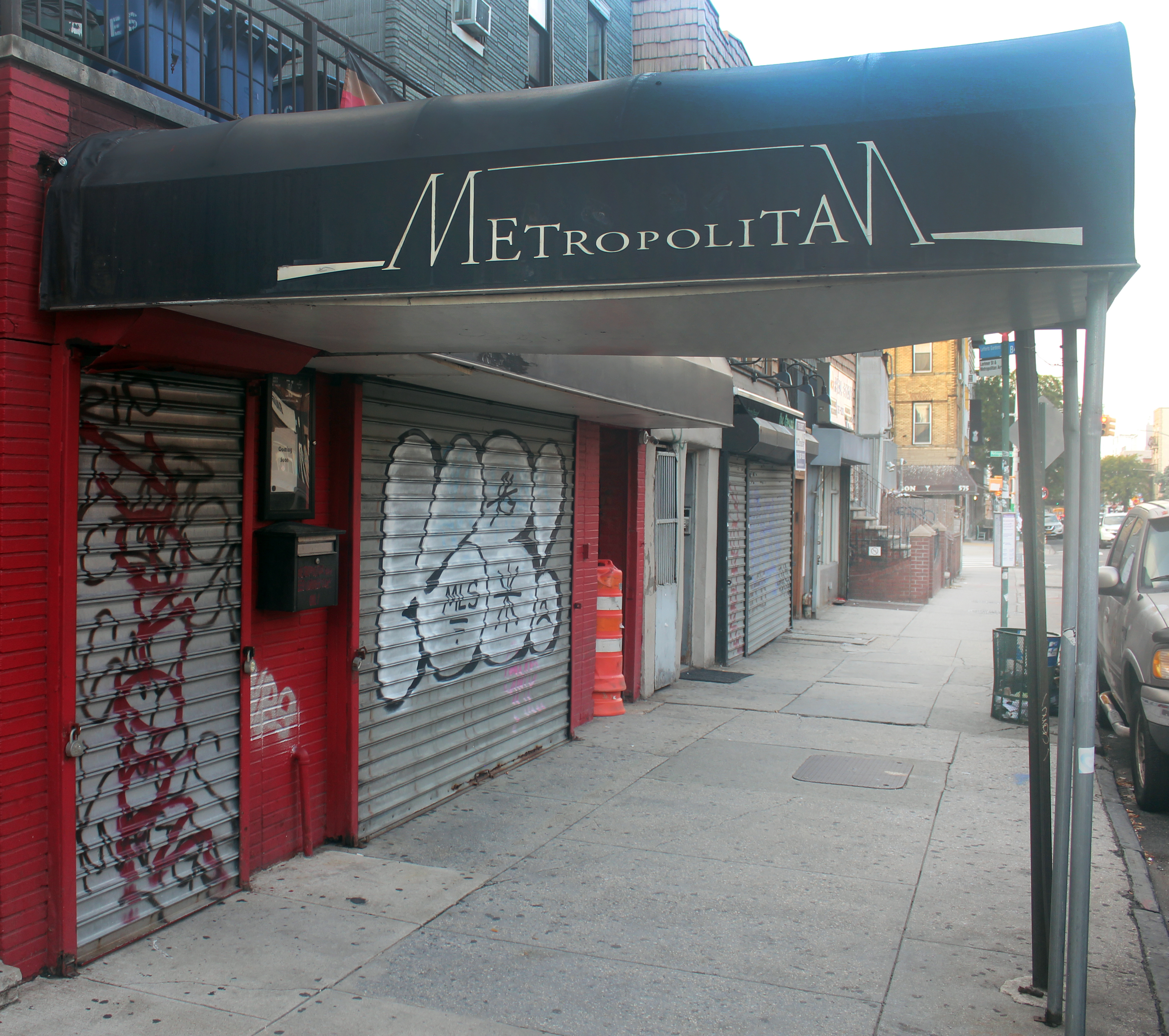
- Metropolitan in October 2020
- Interactive map of Metropolitan
- Address: 559 Lorimer Street; Brooklyn, New York; USA
- Location: Williamsburg, Brooklyn
- Coordinates: 40°42′49″N 73°56′58″W
- Type: Gay bar
- Public transit: Metropolitan Avenue

Construction
- Opened: 2002

Website
- www.metropolitanbarny.com

Metropolitan is a gay bar in the Williamsburg neighborhood of Brooklyn in New York City.

== Description ==
Metropolitan is near the intersection of Lorimer Street and Metropolitan Avenue in Williamsburg. It is a dive bar featuring a multi-level lounge, pool table, dancefloor, and backyard patio. Since its founding, Metropolitan has hosted weekly barbecues on its back patio on Sundays from Memorial Day weekend to the end of September. Other events hosted by the bar include "Queeraoke" on Tuesday nights, Wednesday night trivia, Gender Xperts, a monthly gender queer open mic night, as well as a monthly comedy show.

== History ==
Metropolitan sits on a lot previously occupied by a colonial-era cemetery that was likely owned by the First Reformed Dutch Church of Williamsburgh. The land was declared forlorn sometime before the mid-1800s and was developed into real estate by the end of the century. From 1927 to 2000, the building now on the lot was occupied by Milo's Restaurant, a bar that initially operated as a Prohibition-era speakeasy. Following the closure of Milo's, the site was occupied by an Irish pub before Metropolitan opened in 2002.

In February 2012, Brooklyn Community Board 1 rejected Metropolitan's request for a liquor license renewal, citing complaints that the bar failed to abide by state guidelines that obligate bars to close outdoor spaces by 11 p.m. on weeknights and 1 a.m. on weekends. The board's vote was merely a recommendation, and Metropolitan's liquor license was ultimately renewed by the State Liquor Authority.

In September 2018, two gay men were assaulted after leaving Metropolitan by a man who uttered homophobic slurs. The accused perpetrator was arrested on a variety of assault and hate crime charges and faces up to 15 years in prison if convicted.

== Reception ==
Metropolitan was ranked as the best gay bar in New York by New York magazine in 2005 and 2008. In 2015, New York ranked Metropolitan as the best gay bar in Brooklyn, calling it "a Grand Central Station for Brooklyn’s gay scene, with a lively roster of DJs, drag queens, and events that are always mixed and never exclusionary".

== See also ==
- List of dive bars
