= Pink Feather =

Defunct restaurant and bar in Portland, Oregon, U.S.

Pink Feather Restaurant and Lounge
- Interactive map of Pink Feather Restaurant and Lounge

Restaurant information
- Established: 1957
- Closed: October 2017
- Location: 14154 Southeast Division St., Portland, Oregon, United States
- Coordinates: 45°30′13.9″N 122°31′2.3″W

The Pink Feather Restaurant and Lounge, or simply the Pink Feather, was a restaurant and dive bar in Portland, Oregon's Powellhurst-Gilbert neighborhood, in the United States. The restaurant opened in 1957 and closed in October 2017. It was included in Willamette Week's 2016 list of the best bars in East Portland.

== See also ==
- List of dive bars
