= Patty's Inn =

- Exterior of Patty's Inn circa 2021
- Interactive map of Patty's Inn

Restaurant information
- Established: 1933
- Closed: August 1, 2021
- Owner: Google (demolished)
- Previous owner: Ken Solis
- Location: 102 South Montgomery Street (formerly), San Jose, Santa Clara, California, 95110, United States
- Coordinates: 37.329087933401375°N 121.90092282995042°W

Patty's Inn was a dive bar located on South Montgomery Street in San Jose, California. On August 1, 2021, it closed after more than 80 years in business to make space for Google's "Downtown West" project.

== History and description ==
Established in 1933, Patty's Inn operated out of a small, wooden structure originally built in 1890 that was formerly located on the corner of Montgomery and San Fernando streets near the SAP Center and the San Jose Diridon Station. Over the next 30+ years it went through several name changes including "O’Neill & Krickeberg Liquor", "Corda's Restaurant" and the "Depot Inn Tavern" before reverting to the "Patty's Inn" name in 1971. In 1987, regular patrons Mike Gathers, a former Southern Pacific railroad engineer and co-worker Dave DiSalvo purchased the property, though the land still belonged to Pat's son Roy Krickeberg. From 2001 until its closure, the bar was owned and operated by Ken Solis. Patty's Inn was listed in a San Jose telephone directory from 1934 and in its 88 years of business had survived 1989's Loma Prieta earthquake and a 1993 fire before the property was purchased by Google to make room for its planned "Downtown West" development.

== See also ==
- List of dive bars
