= Linda's Tavern =

Bar and restaurant in Seattle, Washington, U.S.

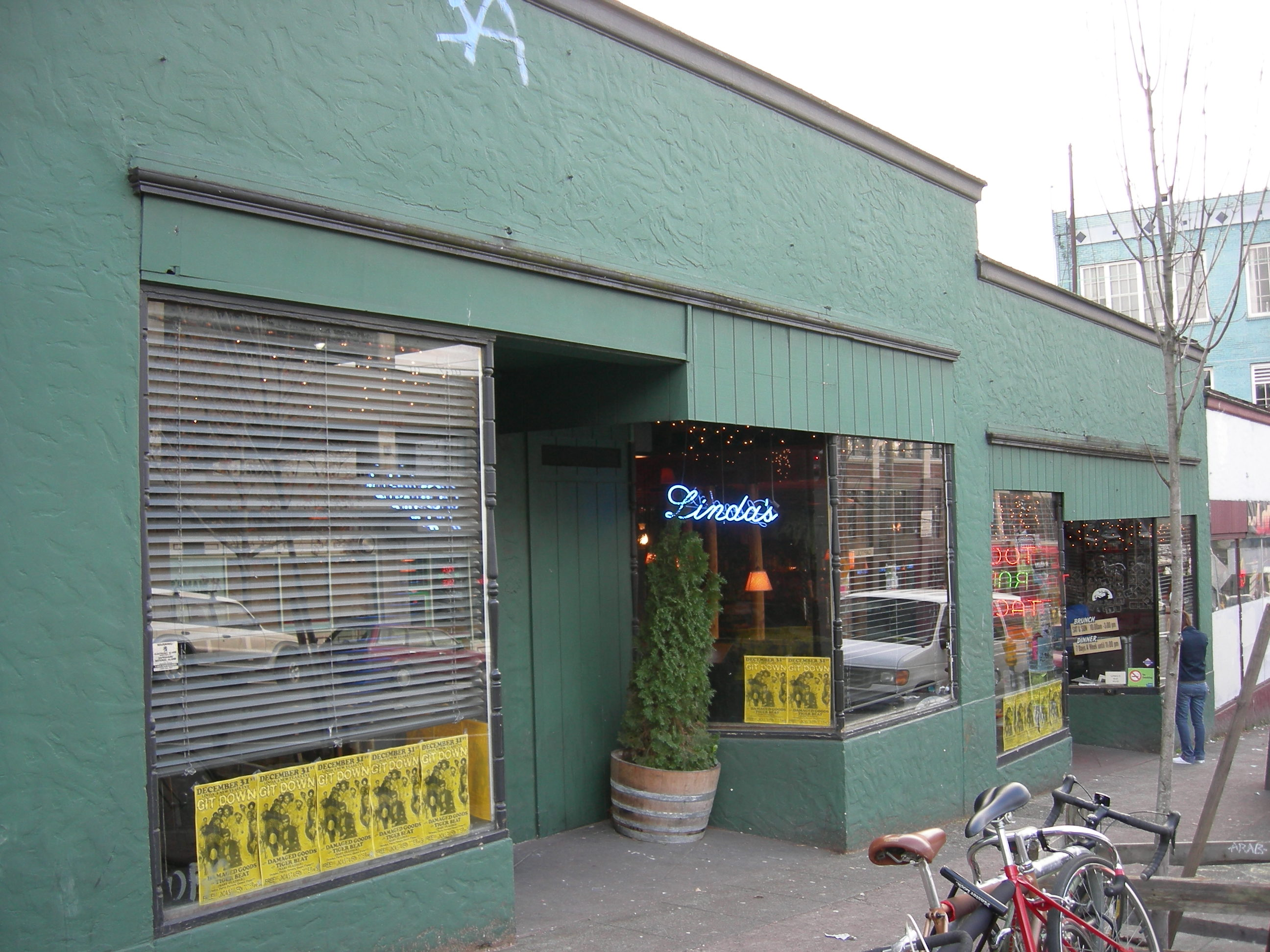
- The tavern's exterior in 2006
- Interactive map of Linda's Tavern

Restaurant information
- Established: 1994
- Location: 707 E Pine Street; Seattle, Washington, U.S.
- Coordinates: 47°36′54.3″N 122°19′22.8″W
- Website: lindastavern.com

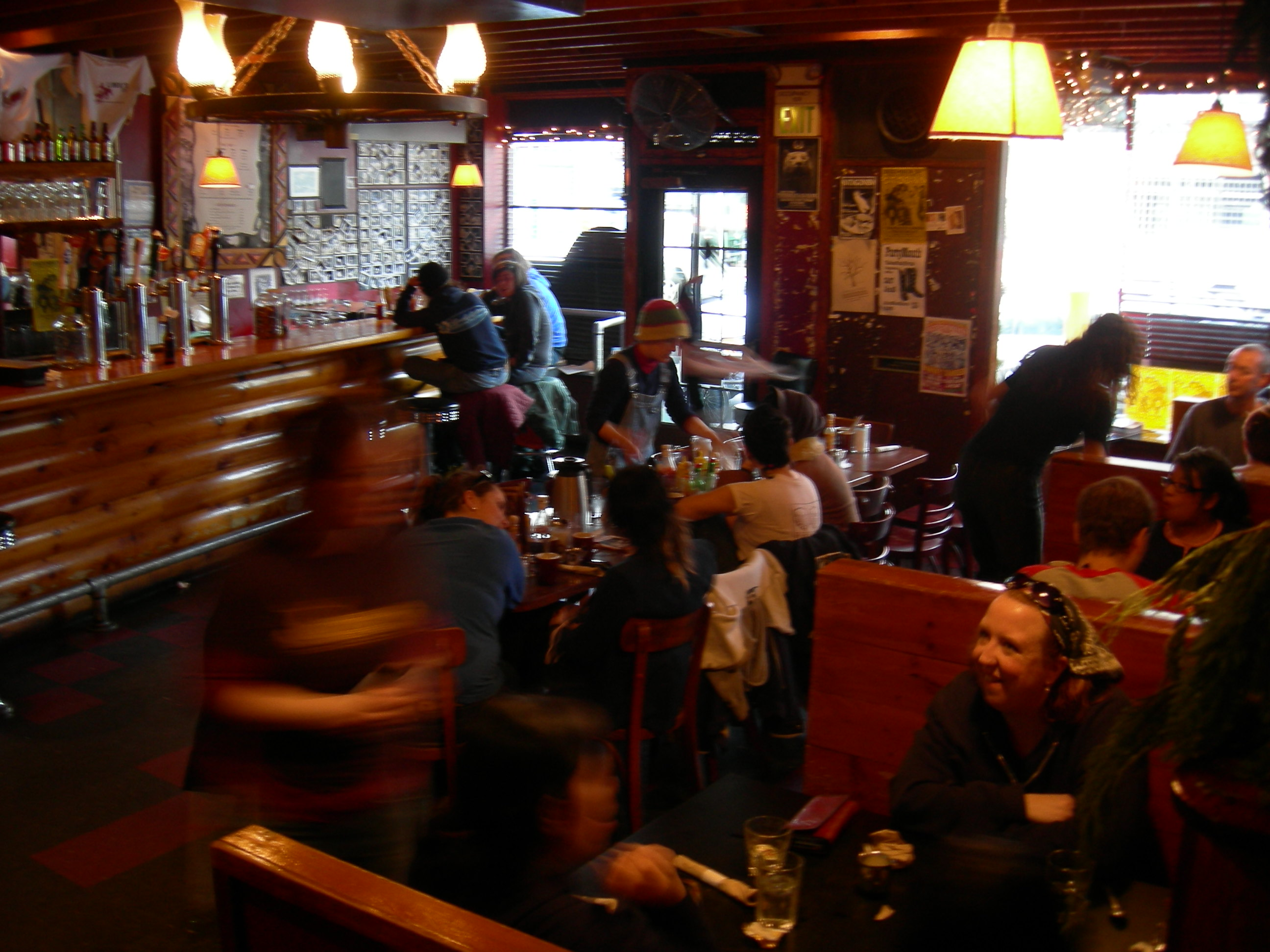
Interior view, 2006

Linda's Tavern is a bar and restaurant in the Capitol Hill neighborhood of Seattle, Washington, United States.

== Description and history ==
Opened in February 1994, Linda's is the last place Nirvana frontman Kurt Cobain was spotted before his death. The tavern has been referred to as the "grunge Cheers".

== Reception ==
Linda's has featured on several Thrillist lists, including "Seattle's 26 best Boozy Brunches" (2014), "The 21 best dive bars in America 2014", "14 Seattle Bars That Are Open on Christmas Day" (2015), "The Best Dive Bars in Seattle" (2016), and "The Best Bars in Seattle Right Now" (2017).
