= Laura O. Foster =

American writer

Laura O. Foster is an American writer.

== Biography ==
Foster is from the Midwestern United States, and lived in states including Iowa and Colorado before moving to Portland, Oregon, in 1989. She had long been interested in urban exploration, and was inspired to write books on the subject from walks with her husband in Washington Park. Her book Portland Hill Walks, published by Timber Press in 2005, covers 20 walks within the city's parks and neighborhoods. She had begun research for the book in 2002. Alice Joyce of Booklist noted the variety of details presented for each one and felt Foster's commentary to be "keenly drawn".

The Portland Stairs Book, published by Timber in 2010, features more guided walks of indoor and outdoor staircases, and a list of over 200 of them in the city. A reviewer for the Portland Monthly appreciated the contextualization within local history, writing that "Foster is known for her firm grasp on Portland's long-forgotten history". They considered it a successor to Portland's Little Red Book of Stairs, published in the 1990s. She published a follow-up, Portland Stair Walks, in 2019. The book covers additional transportation features and guided walks.

== Selected bibliography ==
- ——— (2005). Portland Hill Walks. Timber Press. ISBN 0-8819-2692-2.
- ——— (2010). The Portland Stairs Book. Timber Press. ISBN 978-1-60469-069-9.
- ——— (2019). Portland Stair Walks. Microcosm Publishing. ISBN 978-1-62106-345-2.
