= Shorty's Lunch =

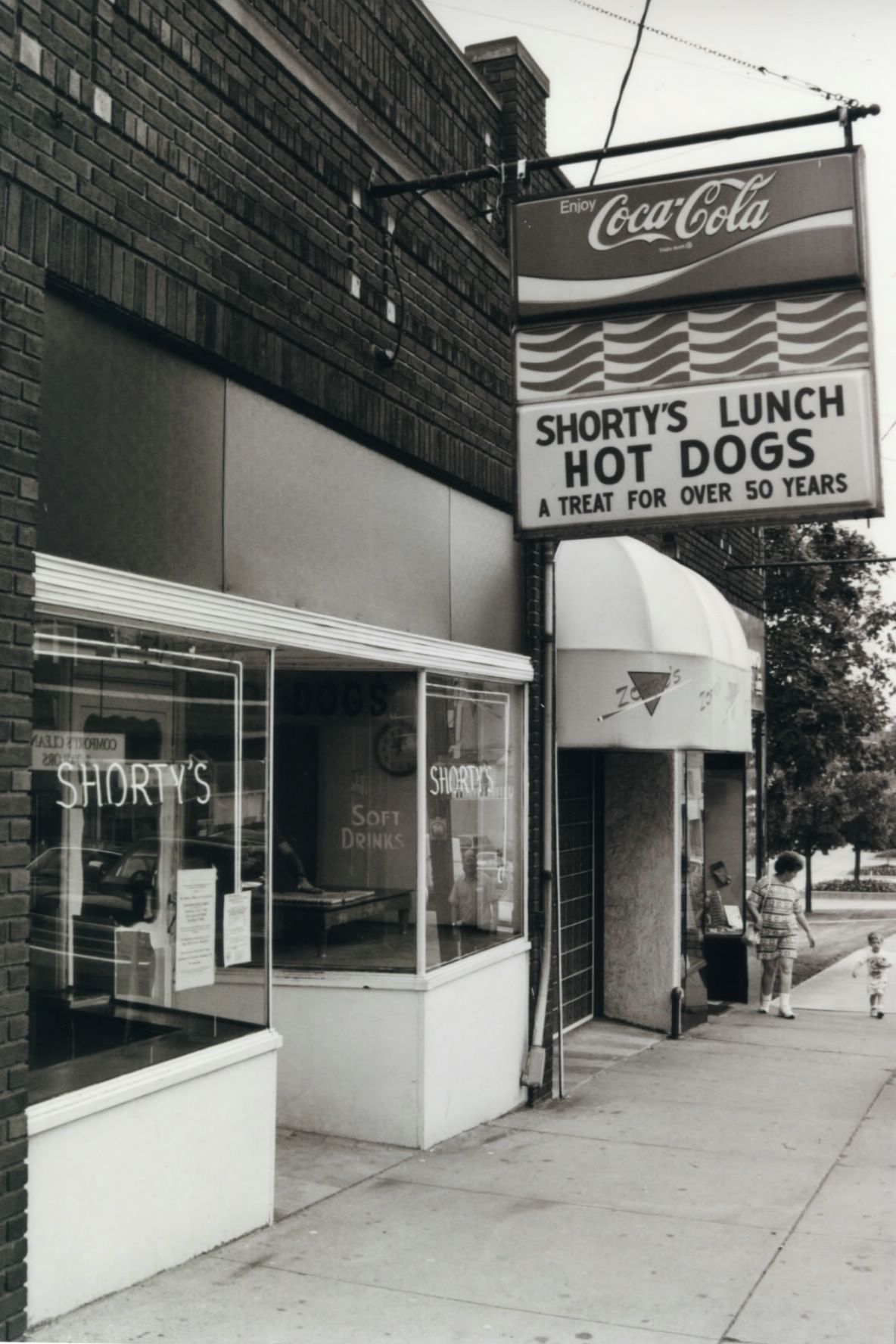
- Shorty's
- Interactive map of Shorty's Lunch

Restaurant information
- Established: 1932
- Owners: John and Steve Alexas
- Food type: hot dogs
- Location: 34 West Chestnut Street, Washington, Pennsylvania
- Coordinates: 40°10′19.8″N 80°14′48″W
- Other locations: Washington Mall; Canton Township

Shorty's Lunch is a Washington, Pennsylvania-based hot dog lunch counter. A "local landmark," Shorty's Lunch was opened by “Shorty” Contorakes, it’s been owned by the Alexas family since the 1930s. It has two locations, including the main facility on West Chestnut Street in Washington, as well as in Canton. The main restaurant has old wooden booths, a dining counter, as well as a large storefront, showing the grill to pedestrians.

== Products ==
The trademark menu item is an Albert's frank with chili sauce, mustard and onions, as well as french fries with gravy. The food is inexpensive, with the hot beef dinner being the most expensive menu item at $7. Shorty's main location sells 600-700 hot dogs a day.

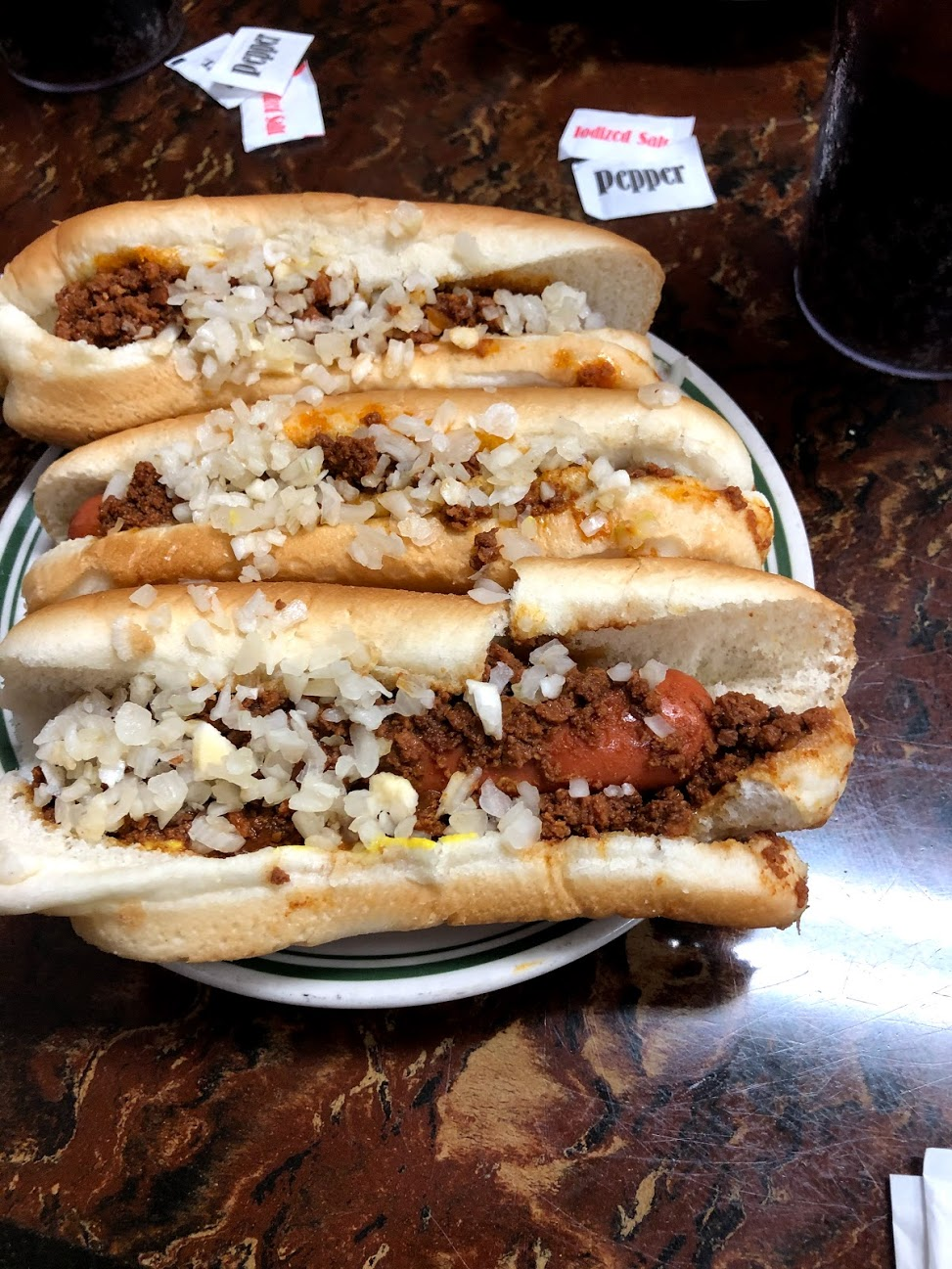
Three of Shorty's trademark dogs with chili sauce, mustard and onions.

The chili sauce is especially favored by customers. The secret recipe takes 4 hours to prepare each 7 to 10-gallon batch. American soldiers serving abroad in England, Germany, Japan, and Vietnam have all received shipments of Shorty's chili sauce in the mail from their mothers. The favored supplier of the hot dogs has changed over time from locations in Germantown, Johnstown, and Green Valley Packing in Taylorstown.

== Reputation and customer base ==
Several years ago we were considering remodeling. The more we thought about it, the more we decided we didn't dare.

— George Alexas, in 1984

The Pittsburgh Post-Gazette says that "[t]he Shorty's name commands a customer loyalty many businesses only dream of developing." That customer loyalty extends to former residents, who make a point to return to Shorty's when they're in town, especially during the holidays. The Observer-Reporter describes Shorty's as having a "local brand recognition that a lot of companies can only dream about" and that a book could be written on the restaurant.

An associate professor of entrepreneurship at the nearby Washington & Jefferson College said that the customer loyalty and business model represents "almost a case study for a franchising class."

A common belief among customers is that the secret to Shorty's resides within the grill, with many believing that it remains the original from the 1930s. However, when the original grilltop malfunctioned in the 1980s, the custom-crafted steel replacement was installed under the cover of night, no one noticed.

Documentarian Rick Sebak regretted not being able to profile Shorty's in his hour-long documentary on hot dog shops, A Hot Dog Program, saying that "There's no other place like it. They haven't changed a thing in there since the place opened in the late 1930s. That's what's great about Shorty's. It has a high funk factor."

Photographs of Shorty's have been sold as fundraisers for the Citizens Library in Washington. In 1993, Shorty's was recognized by the Observer-Reporter for raising funds for the Free Care Fund at Children's Hospital of Pittsburgh.

== Clientele ==
The shop has claims a wide variety of clientele, ranging from judges to Tex Ritter. During the 2006 Pennsylvania gubernatorial election, Republican candidate Lynn Swann used Shorty's as a campaign stop.

== History ==
=== Founding ===
In the 1920s, George Contorakes owned Everybody's Lunch on West Chestnut Street from 1924 through 1932, when he bought the Try Me Lunch at 34 West Chestnut Street and renamed it Shorty's Lunch, in honor of his nickname and 5'4" height. In 1938, Peter Alexas became joined with Contorakes to become partners. Partial ownership passed to George Contorakes's son John G. Contorakes, a Washington native and former student at nearby Washington & Jefferson College, until his death in 2001. Shorty's originally operated 24 hours per day; during the first decade of operation, the doors didn't even have locks. However, World War II brought reduced hours because of the lack of workers.

The interior decor and structure has remained relatively unchanged from the original construction, including the 8 original booths that were purchased used during the 1930s.

=== Threats from development ===
In 2003, plans for the Crossroads Project, a redevelopment effort in downtown Washington, Pennsylvania, revealed that developer, Millcraft Industries, and the Washington Redevelopment Authority intended to use several "blighted" city blocks to build a private business development, including outlets similar to Grove City Premium Outlets, lofts and apartments designed to attract students from Washington & Jefferson College, and a 1,200 space parking garage. All told, the project would have been as ambitious as the nearby Southpointe development. The $100 million project would have required the demolition of several buildings through eminent domain, including the building housing Shorty's original 34 Chestnut Street location, and would have significant tax breaks through a tax increment financing program.

In spite of offers by the developer to assist with moving costs, the Alexas family refused to move, gathering 23,860 signatures in a petition to keep their current location, an amazing number in a city with a population of 16,000. They received support of local officials, including the town's mayor. The efforts to keep Shorty's open in the face of pressure for developers has inspired other small business owners, including Shelley's Pike Inn in Houston, Pennsylvania. While the effort to raze Shorty's appears to have stalled, the Alexas family has begun to expand into other locations, to protect themselves from future redevelopment efforts. They have pursued a franchising effort to place stores in Southpointe Shopping Plaza, downtown Canonsburg, and Franklin Township.

== Other locations ==
The owners of the Washington Mall informed the Alexas brothers in late 2004 that they would have to vacate in order for the mall to be turned into a strip shopping center. To replace this store, the Alexas family built another location in Canton Township.

== See also ==
- List of hot dog restaurants
