= Donnie Vegas =

Restaurant in Portland, Oregon, U.S.

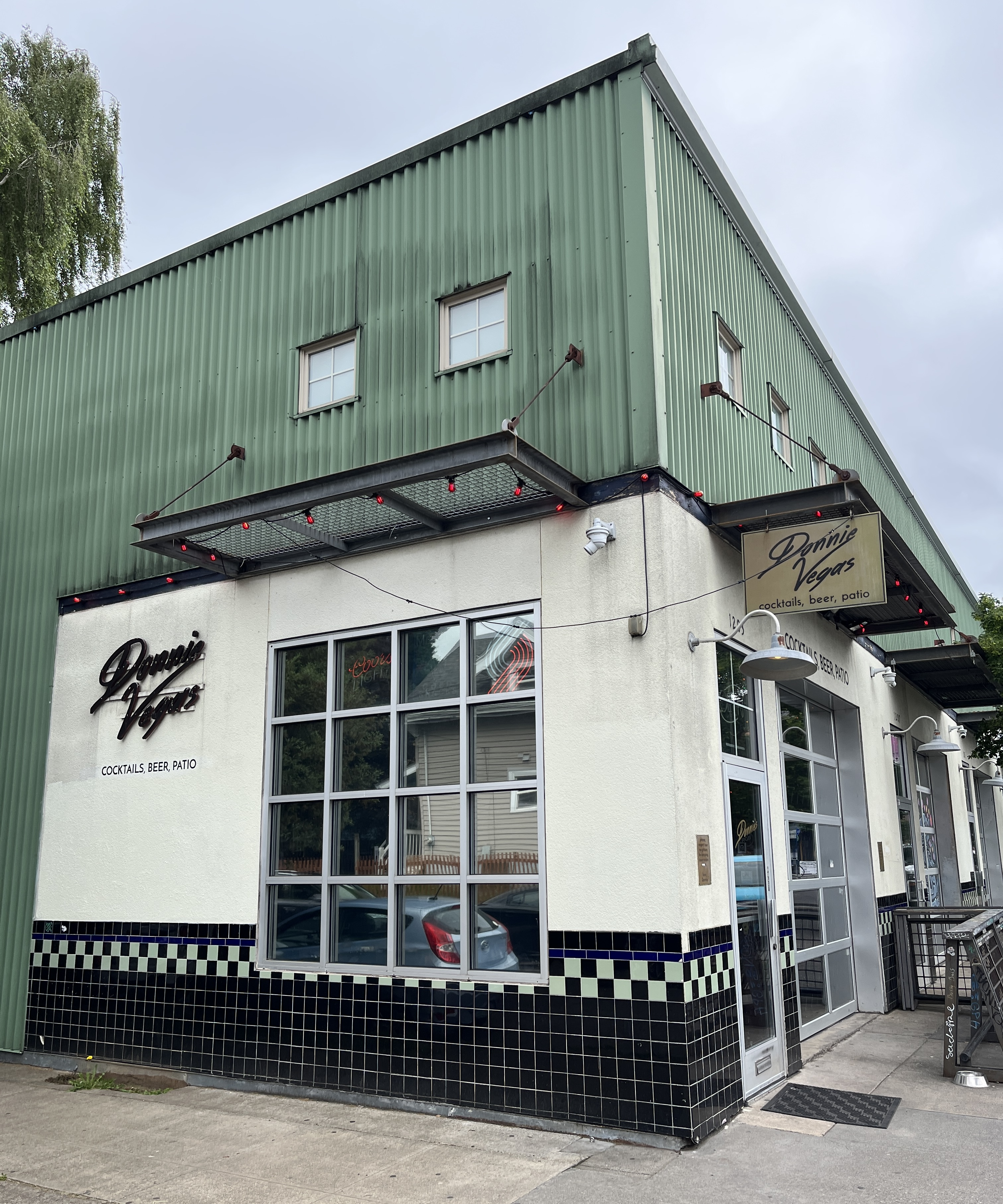
- The restaurant's exterior in 2025
- Interactive map of Donnie Vegas

Restaurant information
- Established: March 2, 2015
- Owners: Benjamin Artaiz; Jeremy Wilson
- Location: 1203 Northeast Alberta Street, Portland, Multnomah, Oregon, 97211, United States
- Coordinates: 45.5592°N 122.6535°W
- Website: donnie.vegas

Donnie Vegas is a dive bar and restaurant in Portland, Oregon, United States. Opened by chef Benjamin Artaiz and bartender Jeremy Wilson in 2015, Donnie Vegas specializes in hot dogs and cocktails.

== Description ==
Donnie Vegas is a dive bar and restaurant on Alberta Street in northeast Portland's King neighborhood. Danielle Centoni of Eater Portland said the business has the "soul of a dive bar" and wrote, "The decor is fun, but minimal, the food and drink menus small and approachable." Ben Waterhouse of The Oregonian said Donnie Vegas offers "premixed cocktails served in pint glasses and hot dogs with unusual toppings in a room decorated with images of old Las Vegas". The 860-square-foot space has a bathroom mural by Brandon Gomez depicting Bruce Lee and Mike Tyson fighting. Donnie Vegas also has a back patio and a vending machine "full of oddities, including vintage paperbacks, 'misfortune cookies' and other sundry amusements".

=== Menu ===
Hot dog variations on the menu have included chili cheese, the Old German with sauerkraut, and the Seattle with cream cheese and caramelized onions. The Banh Mi Dog has fresh and pickled vegetables as well as mayonnaise, and the Tokyo Dog has cream cheese, scallions, and togarashi seasoning. The Seoul Dog has kimchi, scallions, and sambal aioli, and the Tijuana Dog has cream cheese, pico de gallo, jalapeño, and cilantro. The currywurst has curry-flavored ketchup and caramelized onions, and the Frito pie has chili, chips, and lettuce. The restaurant's beef chili has black, kidney, and pinto beans, chipotle, coriander, and cumin, as well as green onion, jalapeño, and sour cream. Field Roast vegan hot dogs are also on the menu.

The cocktail menu has included a Moscow Mule with Volstead Vodka and Rachel's Ginger Beer, a wine spritzer with Pok Pok Som drinking vinegar, and a White Russian-inspired caffeinated drink called The Dude, which has Stumptown cold brew, Cruzan Black Strap rum, allspice dram, and condensed milk. The Marg-a-Weed-a is a purple cannabidiol-infused prickly pear slushy with cranberry and blood orange soda, and a lime wedge on the glass. Beer, champagne, Jello shots, and wine in a can are also available.

The restaurant's menu says, "Donnie changes the menu whenever he wants, ya dig." Prior to the COVID-19 pandemic, Donnie Vegas specialized in cocktails on tap, according to Janey Wong of the Portland Mercury. The business prioritized wine-based drinks during the pandemic to accommodate Oregon Liquor and Cannabis Commission regulations.

== History ==
Chef Benjamin Artaiz and bartender Jeremy Wilson's opened Donnie Vegas on March 2, 2015.

== Reception ==
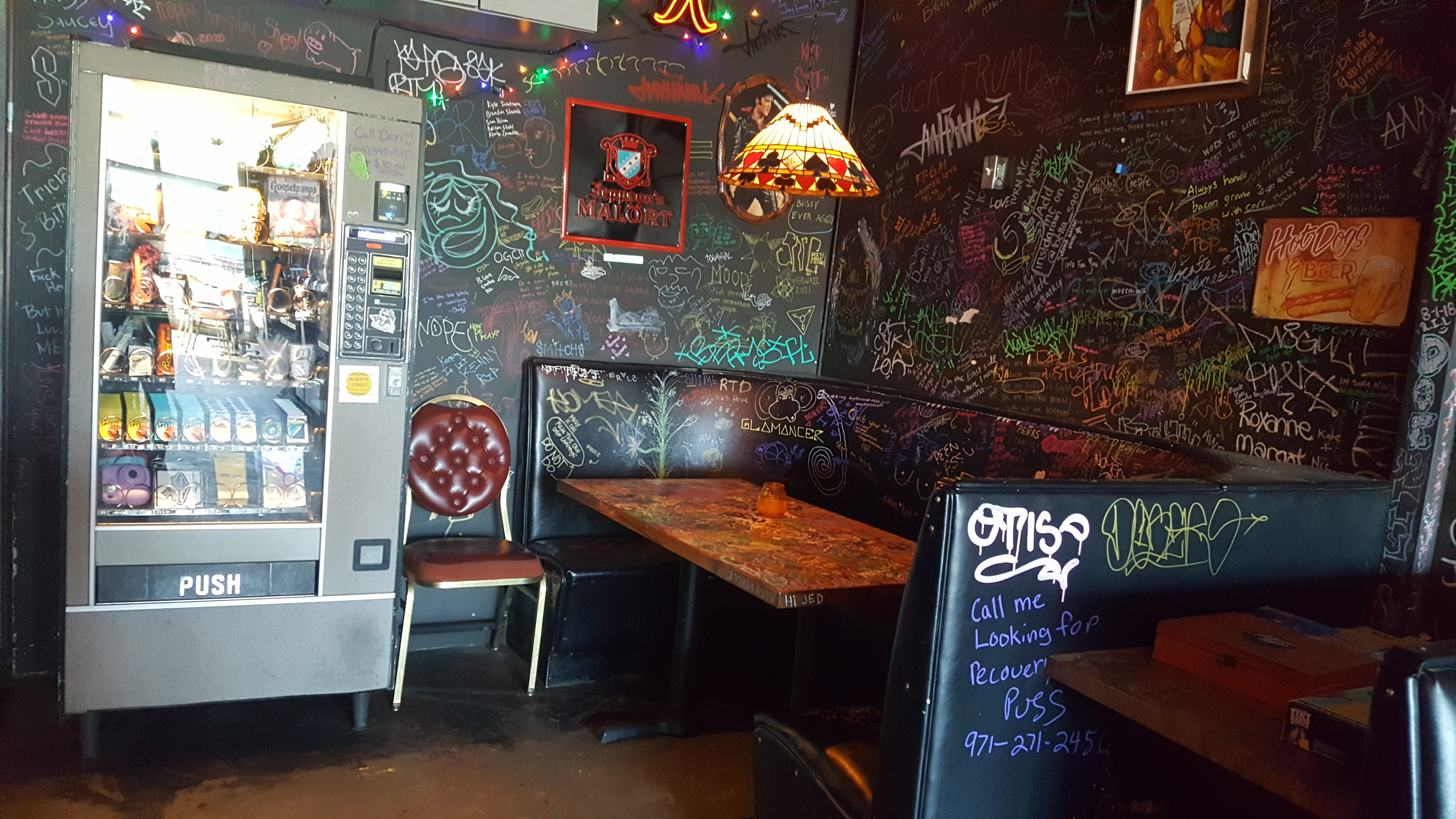
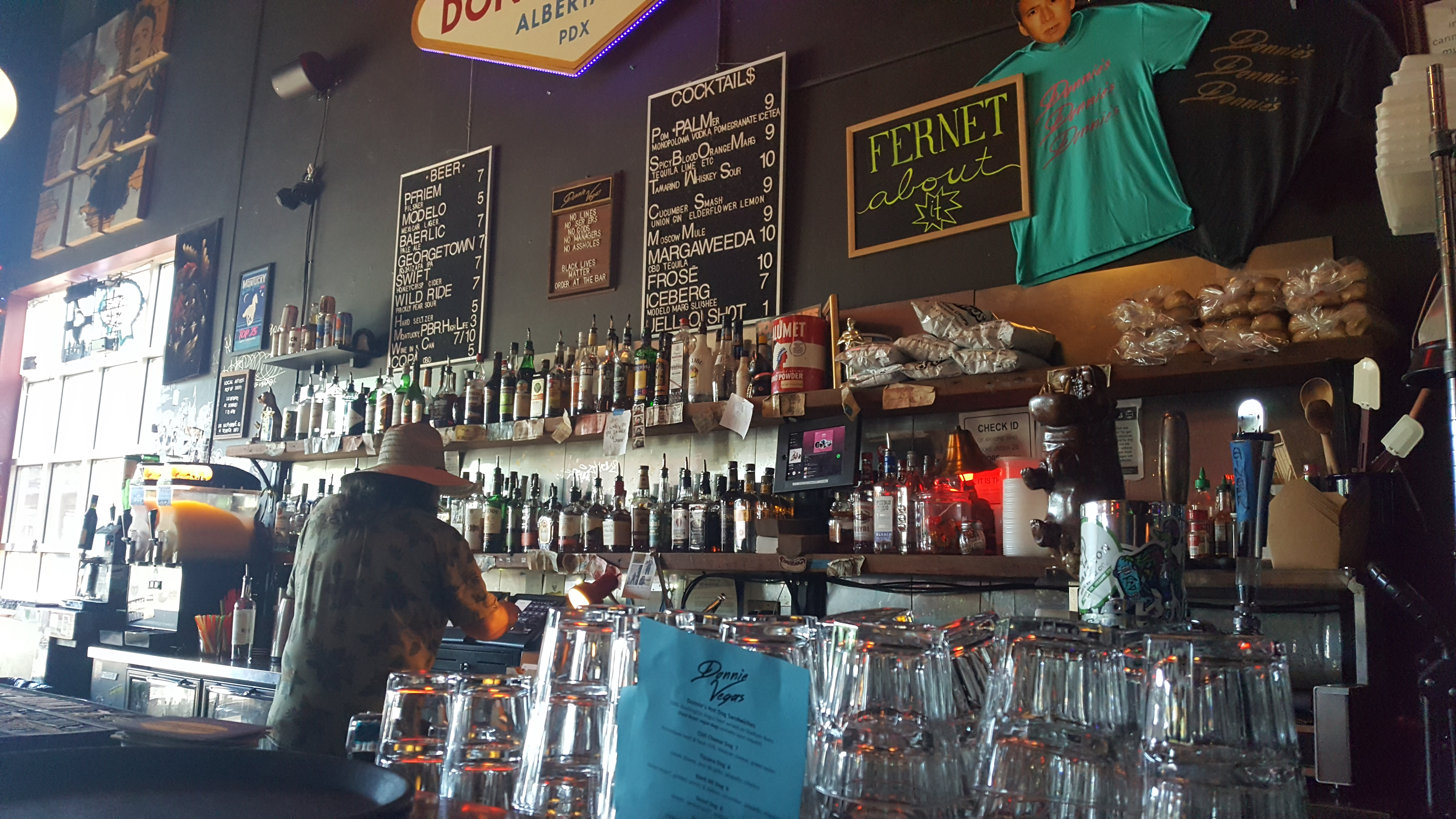
The restaurant's interior, 2022

In 2015, Ben Waterhouse of The Oregonian opined, "The cocktails are simple, well-executed standards, many of them featuring ginger beer, and the hot dogs are the kind you find at the grocery store. It's an odd place, but not a pretentious one." In 2018, Matthew Singer of Willamette Week called Donnie Vegas a "lovingly trashy tribute to Old Vegas". The Portland Mercury's Janey Wong said of the Marg-a-Weed-a in 2021:

The name is a little corny and yet a little genius, which is to say I absolutely love it. The frozen slushy contains 5 mg of hemp derived CBD per serving, tequila, and (the current rotating flavor) pomegranate. Relaxant, booze, and some antioxidants… I feel like you can't ask for much more out of a cocktail. The pomegranate lends a nice tartness that plays well off the tequila.

Caroline Pardilla included The Dude in Eater's 2015 list of "22 Impressive Cold Brew Cocktails". Donnie Vegas was also included in Eater Portland's 2015 list of the "Ten Portland Bars with Outdoor Games", as well as Nathan Williams' 2022 list of "17 Places Serving Portland's Finest Hot Dogs". Thom Hilton included the restaurant in Eater Portland's 2022 list of "14 Spots for Late-Night Dining in Portland". He described the bar as a "funky, Americana space". Katherine Chew Hamilton and Nick Campigli included Donnie Vegas in Portland Monthly's 2021 list of "7 Must-Try Hot Dog Hotspots". Amanda Tarlton selected Donnie Vegas to represent Oregon in Reader Digest's 2022 list of "The Best Hot Dog in Every State".

== See also ==
- List of dive bars
- List of hot dog restaurants
