= List of hot dog restaurants =

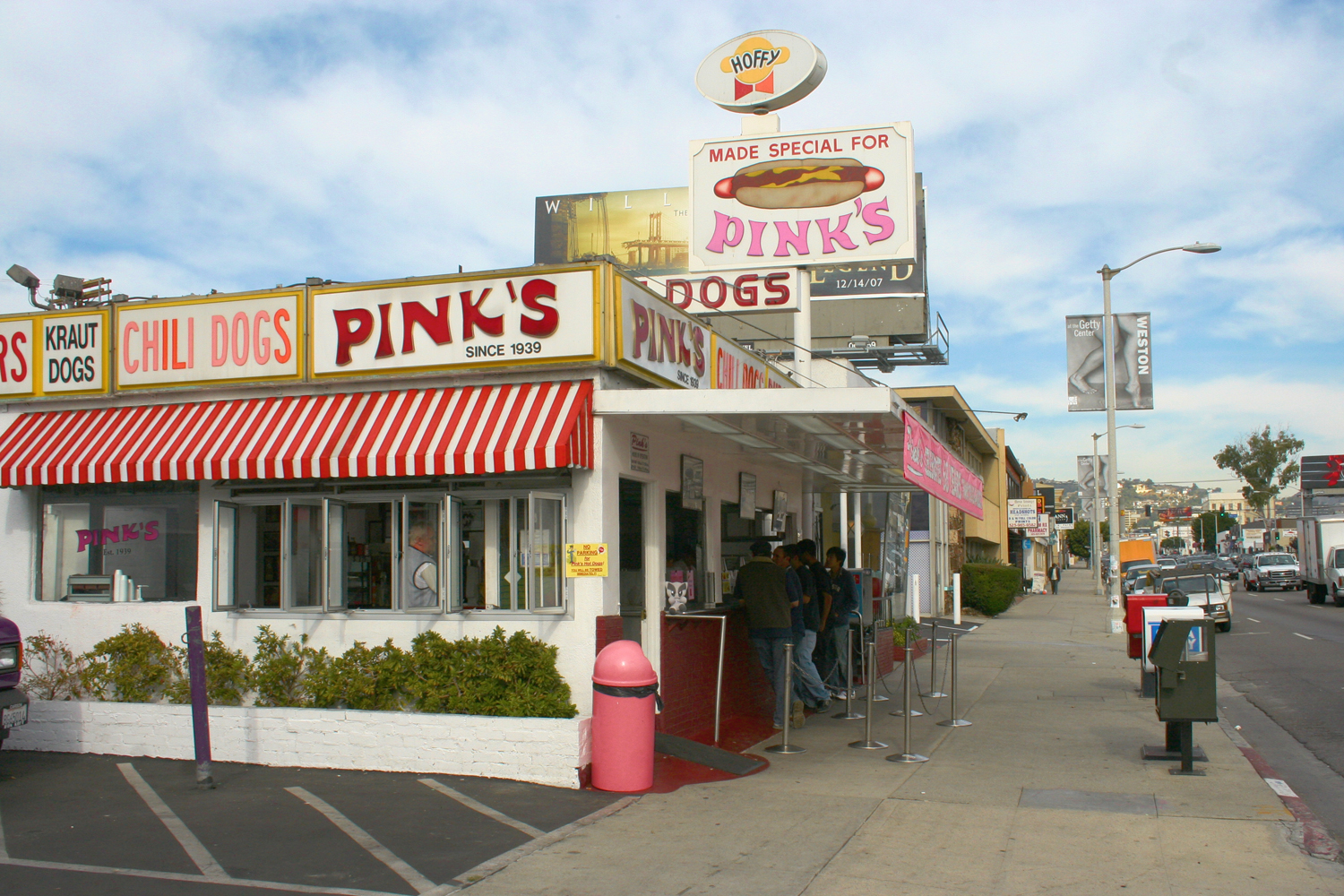
Pink's Hot Dogs in the Hollywood district of Los Angeles

This is a list of notable hot dog restaurants.

This list includes restaurants, fast food restaurants and hot dog stands that primarily serve hot dogs and related food items.

== Hot dog restaurants ==
- Art's Famous Chili Dog Stand – Hot dog stand in Los Angeles, California, U.S.
- Bæjarins Beztu Pylsur – Hot dog stand chain in Reykjavík, Iceland
- La Belle Province – Fast food restaurants chain in Quebec, Canada
- Big Daddy's Restaurants – U.S. restaurant chain
- Carney's – Restaurant in Los Angeles, California, U.S.
- Casper's – Hot dog restaurant chain based in the East Bay, California, U.S.
- Coney Island – Type of American restaurant
- Coney Island Hot Dog Stand – Hot dog restaurant in Bailey, Colorado, U.S.
- Cozy Dog Drive In – Restaurant in Springfield, Illinois, U.S.
- Decarie Hot Dog – Hot dog restaurant in Montreal, Quebec, Canada
- Dixie Chili and Deli – Restaurant chain in the U.S. state of Kentucky
- Dog n Suds – American drive-in eatery chain
- Donnie Vegas – Restaurant in Portland, Oregon, U.S.
- Essie's Original Hot Dog Shop – Restaurant in Pittsburgh, Pennsylvania, U.S.
- Fluky's
- Franks-A-Lot – Hot dog restaurant in Portland, Oregon, U.S.
- Gene & Jude's – Hot dog stand in River Grove, Illinois, U.S.
- Gray's Papaya – Hot dog restaurant chain in New York City
- Hillbilly Hot Dogs
- Hot Dog on a Stick – Fast food franchise
- Hot Doug's – Restaurant in Illinois, US
- James Coney Island – American restaurant chain
- Japadog – Restaurant chain in British Columbia, Canada
- Katz's Delicatessen – Jewish deli in Manhattan, New York City
- Lafleur Restaurants – Canadian chain of fast food restaurants
- Marathon Enterprises, Inc. – American brand of food products
- Max's Bar & Grill – Restaurant in Long Branch, New Jersey, U.S.
- Mel's Drive-In – American restaurant chain
- Montreal Pool Room – Restaurant in Montreal, Quebec, Canada
- The Munch Box – Fast food restaurant in Chatsworth, California, U.S.
- Nathan's Famous – Fast food restaurant chain
- National Coney Island – American restaurant chain
- Nedick's – American fast food chain
- New York Fries – Canadian fast-food restaurant chain
- Nick's Famous Coney Island, Portland, Oregon, U.S.
- Nu-Way Weiners
- Olneyville New York System – Restaurant in Providence, Rhode Island
- Papaya King – Restaurant in New York City
- Pink's Hot Dogs – Hot dog restaurant in Los Angeles
- Pølsevogn – Danish hot dog stands
- Portillo's Restaurants – Chicago-based fast casual restaurant chain
- Rudy's Hot Dogs
- Rutt's Hut – Restaurant in Clifton, New Jersey, U.S.
- Shopsy's – Jewish delicatessen restaurant chain in Canada
- Shorty's Lunch
- Skyline Chili – Restaurant chain specializing in Cincinnati chili
- Sneaky Pete's – Fast food chain
- Sonic Drive-In – American fast food chain
- Stewart's Restaurants
- Superdawg
- Tail o' the Pup – Hot dog stand in Los Angeles, California
- Ted's Hot Dogs – American fast food chain
- Tony Packo's Cafe, "Hungarian Hot Dogs", Toledo Ohio
- Valentine – Canadian Restaurant Franchise Chain
- Vienna Beef – Hot dog brand
- Walkin' Dog – Restaurant in Minneapolis
- Walter's Hot Dog Stand – Historic commercial building in New York, United States
- Weenie Beenie – Fast food restaurant in Arlington, Virginia, United States
- The Wieners Circle – Hot dog stand in Chicago
- Wienerschnitzel – American fast-food restaurant chain
- The Windmill
- Woody's Chicago Style – American fast food chain
- Yesterdog – Grand Rapids hot dog restaurant
- Yocco's Hot Dogs – Restaurant in Pennsylvania
- Zach's Shack – Bar and restaurant in Portland, Oregon, U.S.
- Zack's Hotdogs – Restaurant in Burlington, North Carolina, U.S.

== Gallery ==
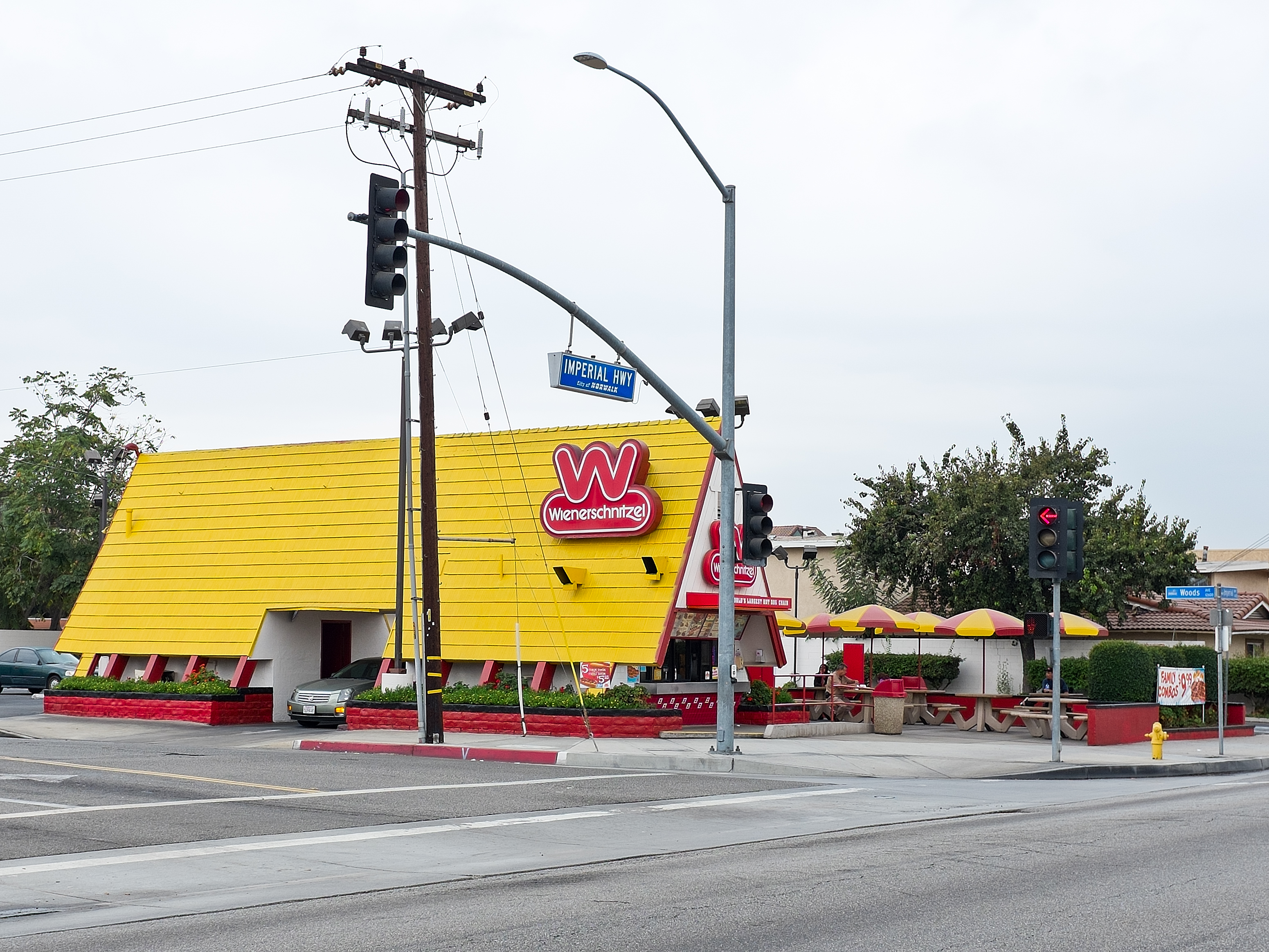
A Wienerschnitzel restaurant located in Norwalk, California, with the steep yellow A-shaped roof of many Weinerschnitzel buildings

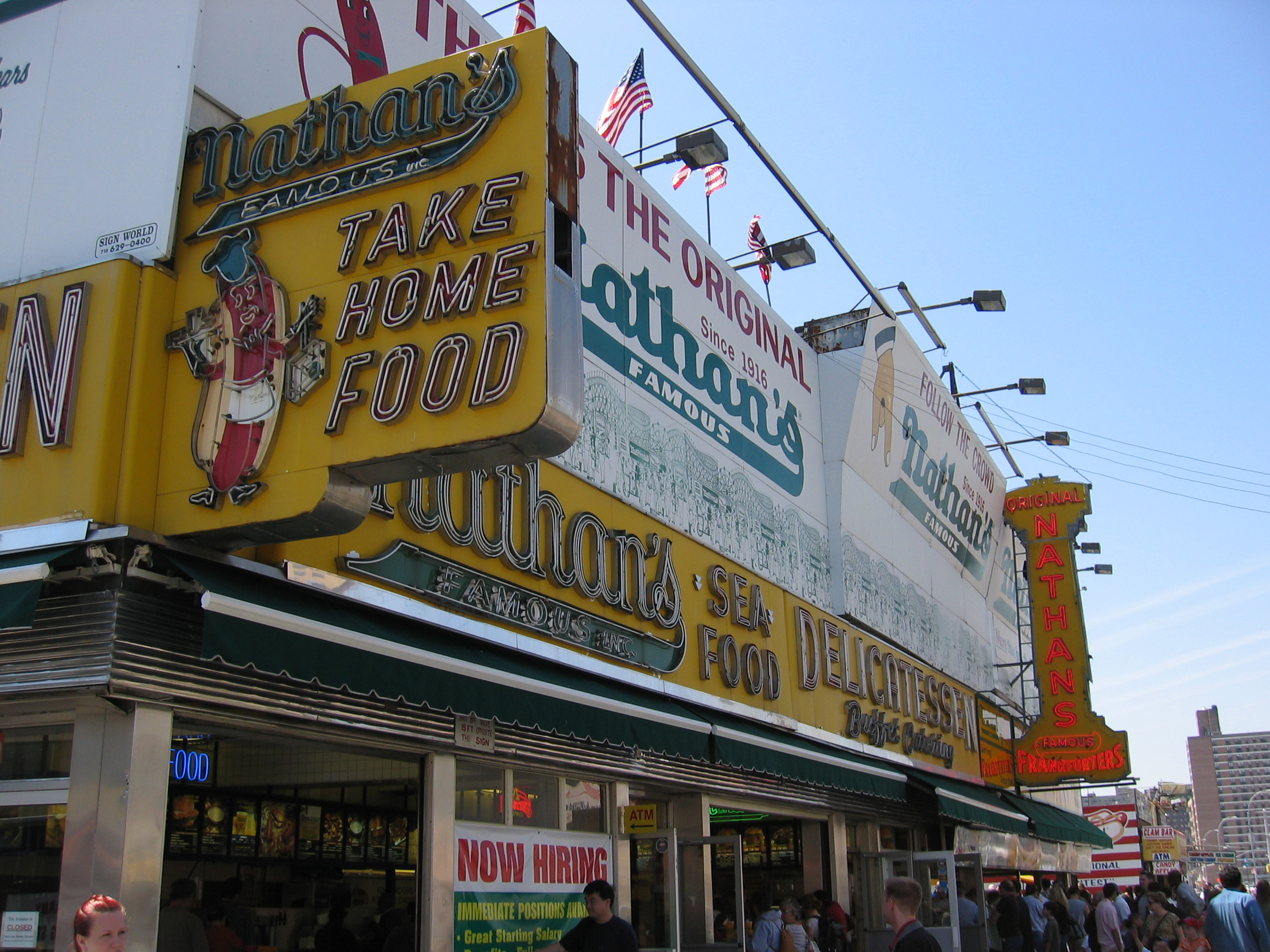
Nathan's Famous' original Coney Island location

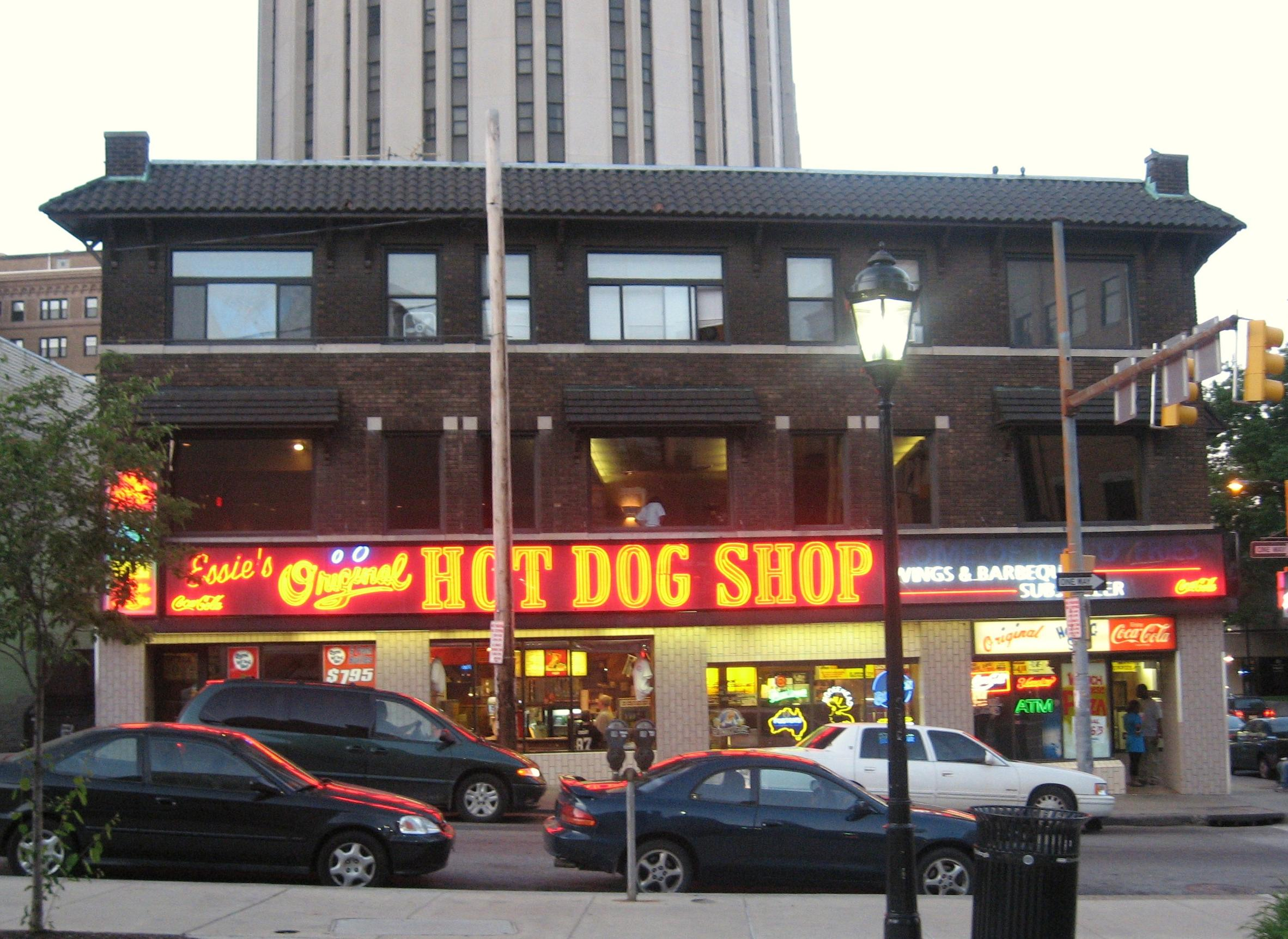
Essie's Original Hot Dog shop in Pittsburgh, Pennsylvania

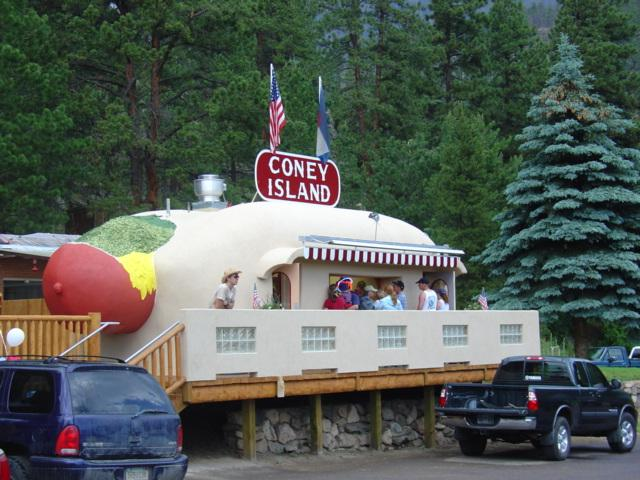
The Coney Island Hot Dog Stand in Bailey, Colorado

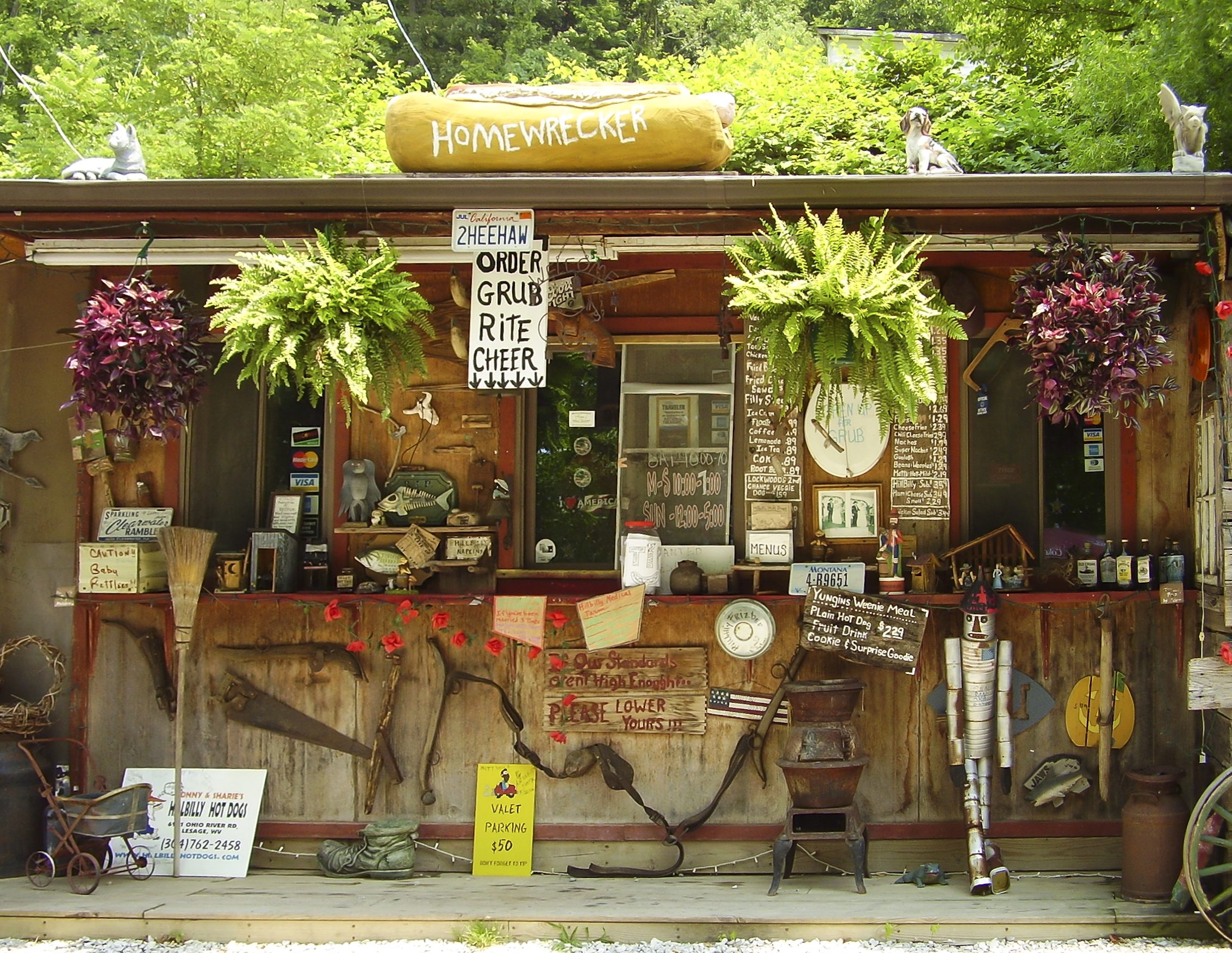
Hillbilly Hot Dogs, a roadside hot dog stand located near Huntington, West Virginia

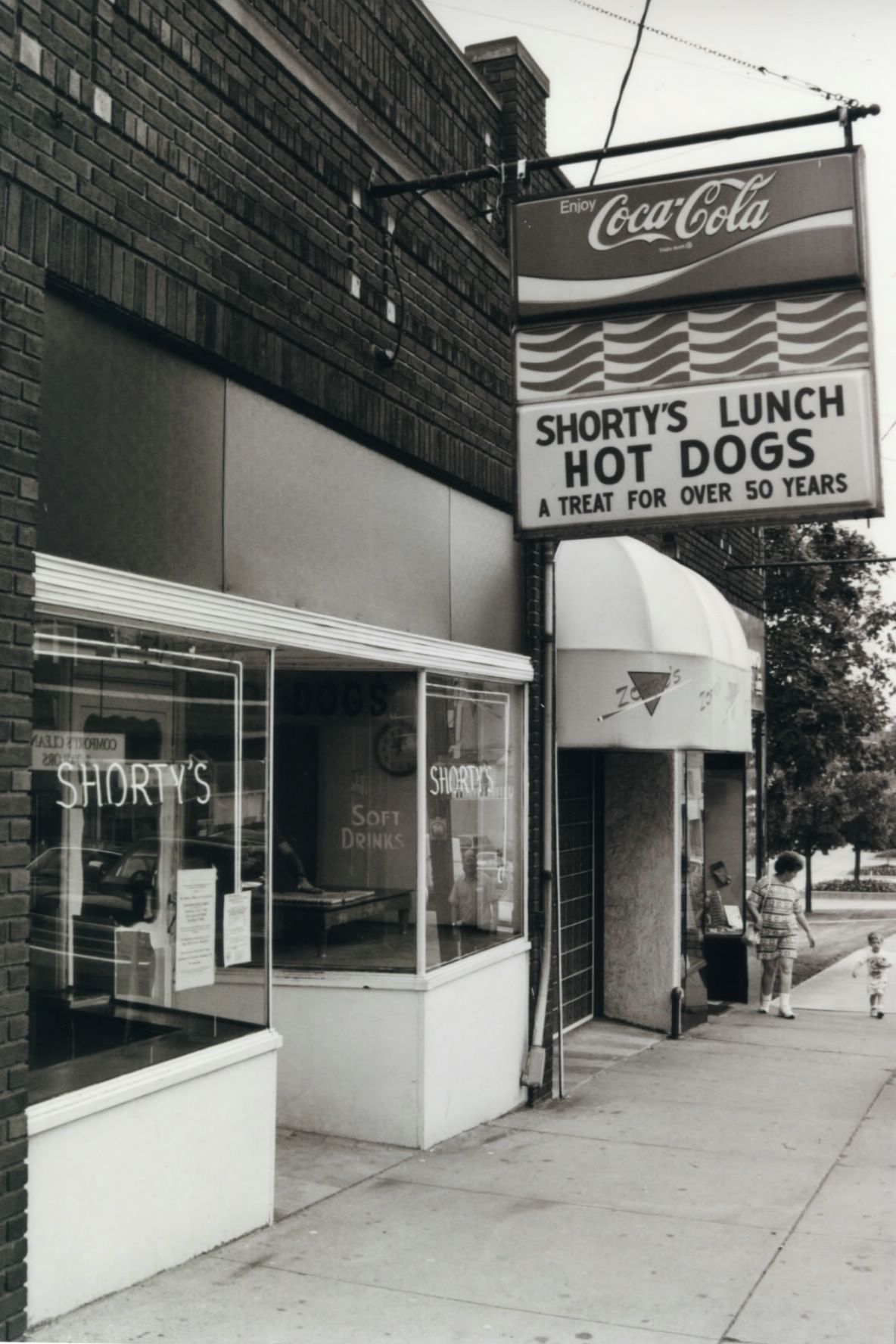
Shorty's Lunch is a Washington, Pennsylvania-based hot dog lunch counter that was established in 1932.

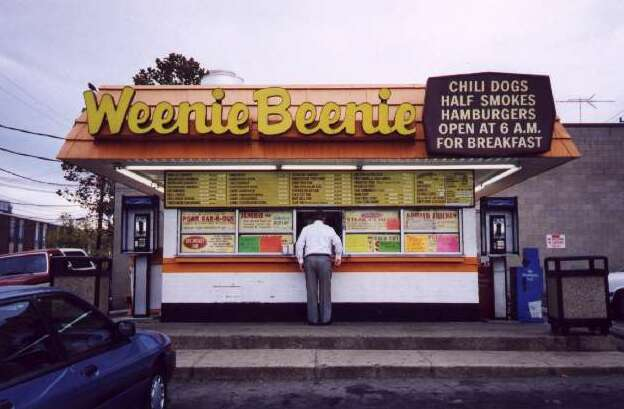
A Weenie Beenie restaurant in South Arlington, Virginia

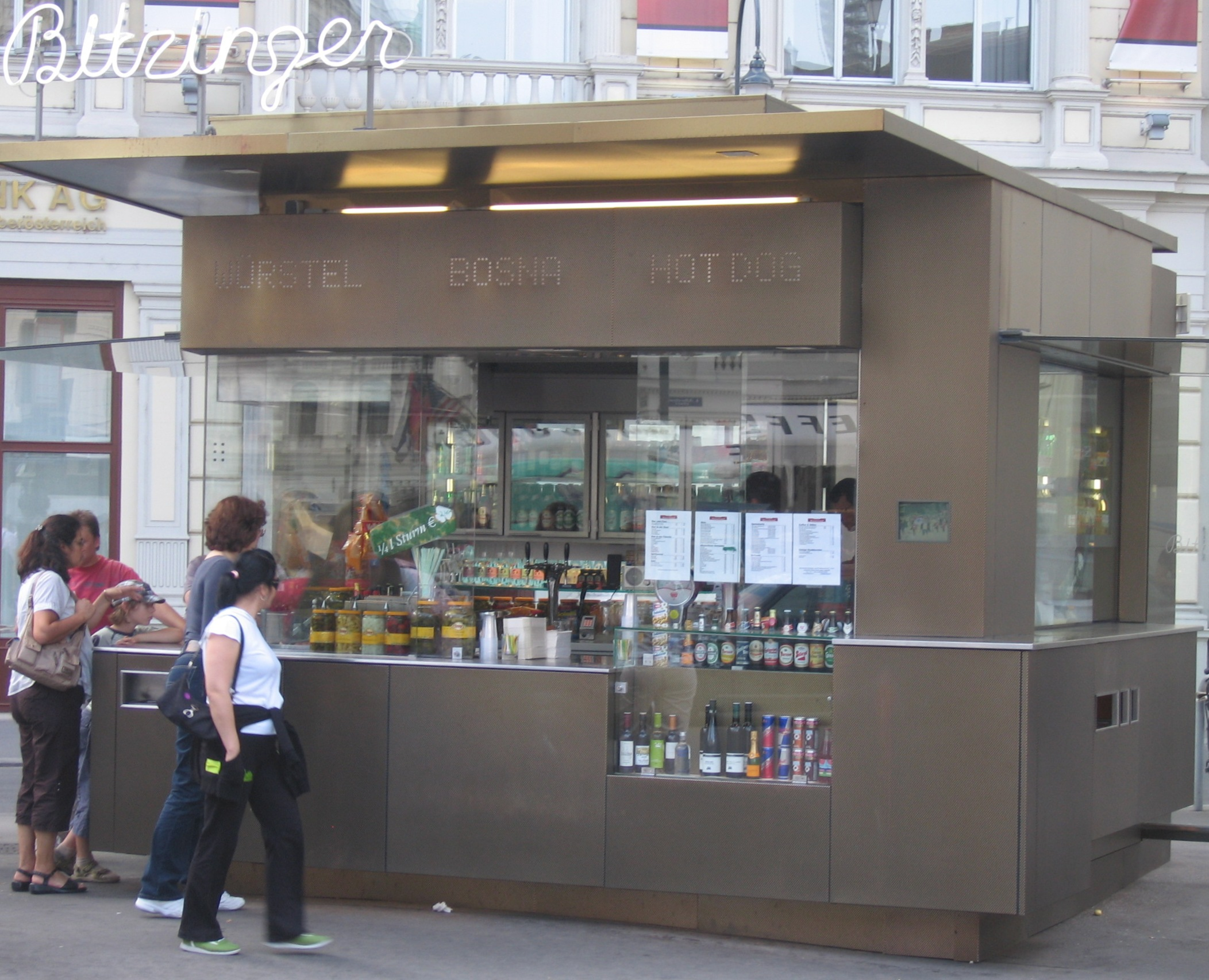
A take-out würstelstand in Vienna, Austria

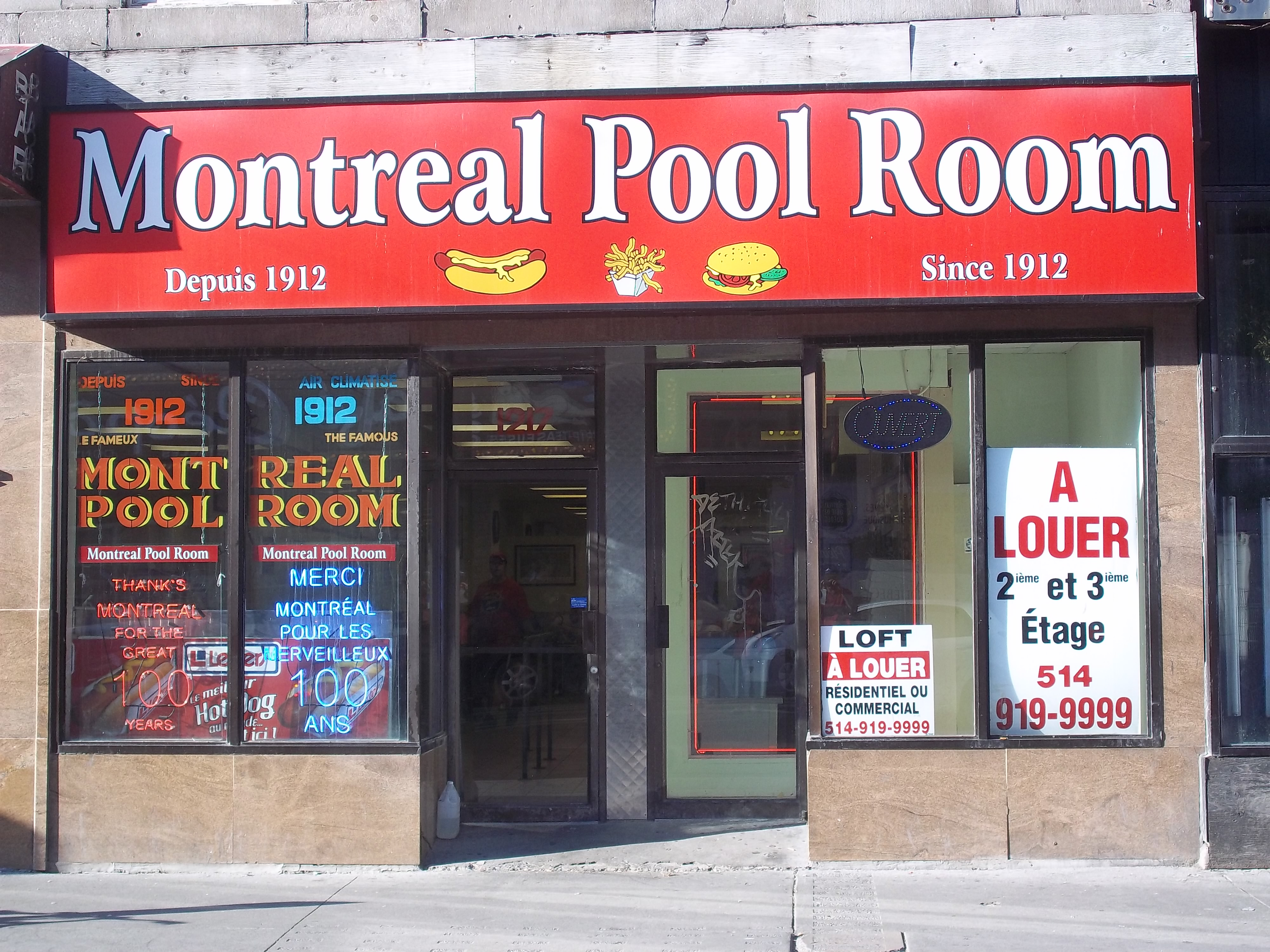
Montreal Pool Room at its new location, in June 2012

== See also ==
- Coney Island hot dog
- List of hot dogs
- List of casual dining restaurant chains
- List of fast food restaurants
- List of hamburger restaurants
- List of street foods
- Hot dog cart
- Hot dog day
- Hot dog variations
- Lists of restaurants
- Types of restaurant
- World's longest hot dog
- "Singing hot dog man", Charley Marcuse
