= Essie's Original Hot Dog Shop =

Restaurant in Pittsburgh, Pennsylvania, U.S.

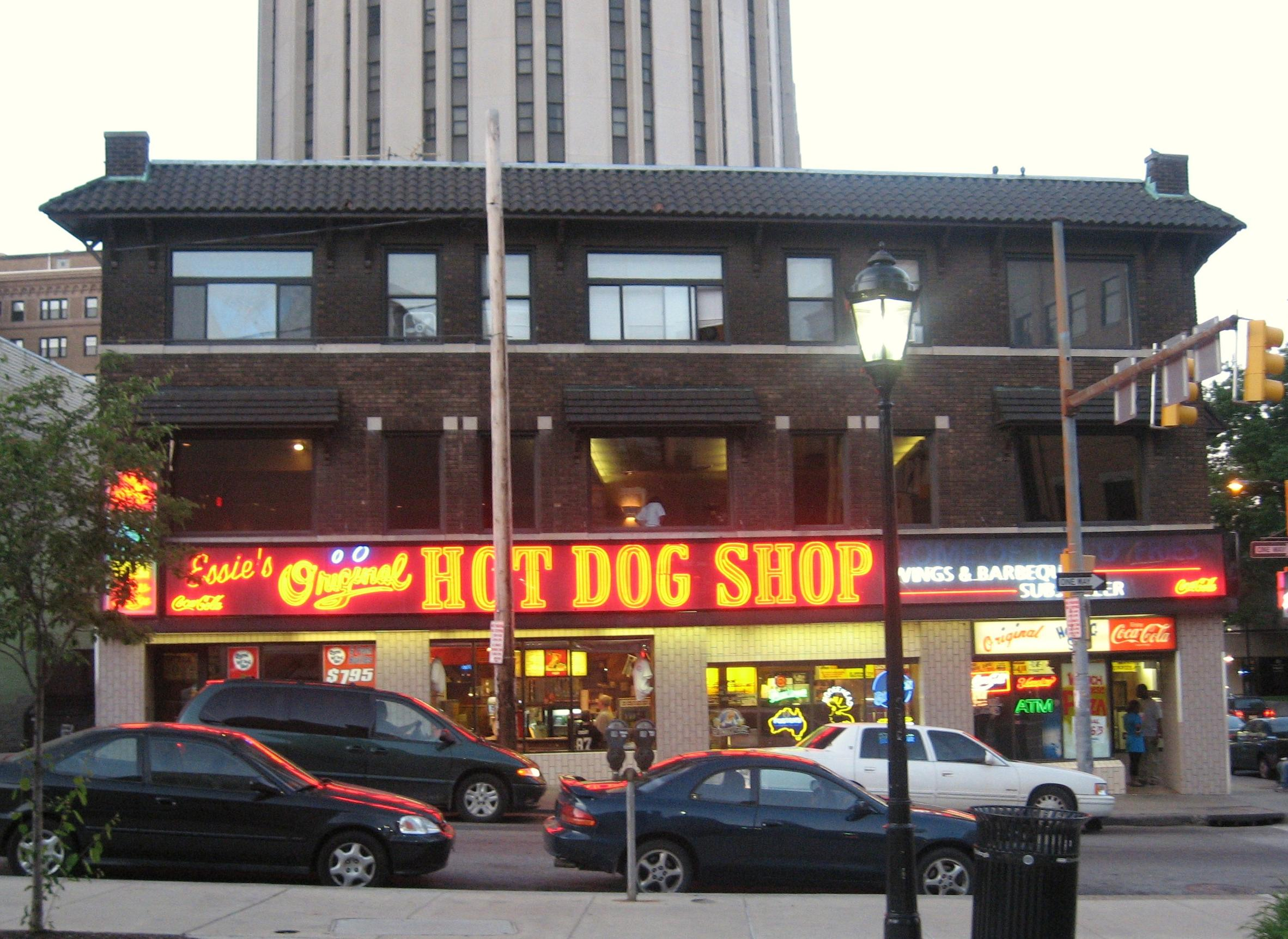
- "The O" on the corner of South Bouquet Street and Forbes Avenue
- Interactive map of Essie's Original Hot Dog Shop

Restaurant information
- Established: 1960
- Closed: April 2020
- Food type: hot dogs, french fries
- Location: 3901 Forbes Avenue, Pittsburgh, Pennsylvania
- Coordinates: 40.442095°N 79.956469°W

Essie's Original Hot Dog Shop (commonly known as The Original Hot Dog Shop, The O or The Dirty O) was a restaurant in the Oakland neighborhood of Pittsburgh, Pennsylvania, United States.

== History ==
The Original Hot Dog Shop was opened by Sydney “Syd” and Morris “Moe” Simon in Pittsburgh, in June 1960 near Forbes Field and the University of Pittsburgh.

The restaurant was originally named "House of Beef", later "The Original Franks & Burgers" and eventually "The Original Hot Dog Shop". Over time, Syd bought out Moe's interest, becoming full owner of the restaurant. "Essie’s" was added in 2000 in memory of Syd's wife, Esther, after her death. Syd's children Terry Campasano and Bruce Simon owned and managed the restaurant starting in the mid-2000s.

The restaurant quickly became known for its hot dogs and large portions of French fries, although the menu also includes sandwiches, salads and pizza. In 2001, Gourmet Magazine ranked the hot dogs fourth-best in America, and The New York Times named it to a list of one of the "high spots in a nation of hot-dog heavens" in 2002. The O was also featured on Rick Sebak's nationally distributed PBS program A Hot Dog Program as well as on an episode of the Food Network's Unwrapped.

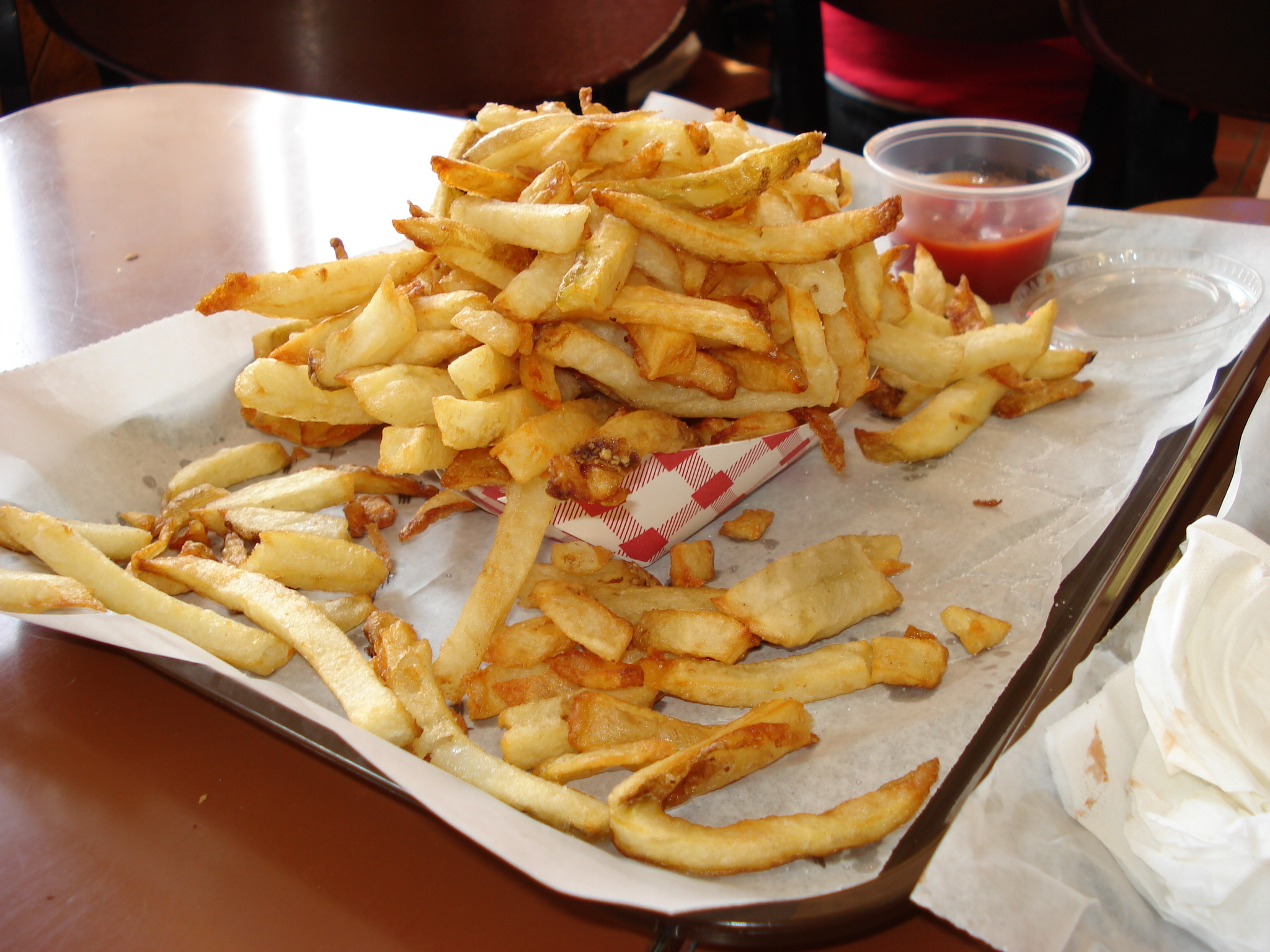
"O" fries

As part of CNN's 100 Places to Eat series, Travel+Leisure's Laura Kiniry ranked the O's fries among the best in the U.S. The University of Pittsburgh's student newspaper The Pitt News named The O "Best French Fries" in 2002, 2003, 2004, 2005, 2006, 2007, and 2008.

A location at Carnegie Mellon University lasted from 1996 to 2006, closing in the wake of an Equal Employment Opportunity Commission complaint and declining profits.

The restaurant closed in April 2020 amidst the COVID-19 pandemic.

== See also ==
- List of hot dog restaurants
