= Zach's Shack =

Bar and restaurant in Portland, Oregon, U.S.

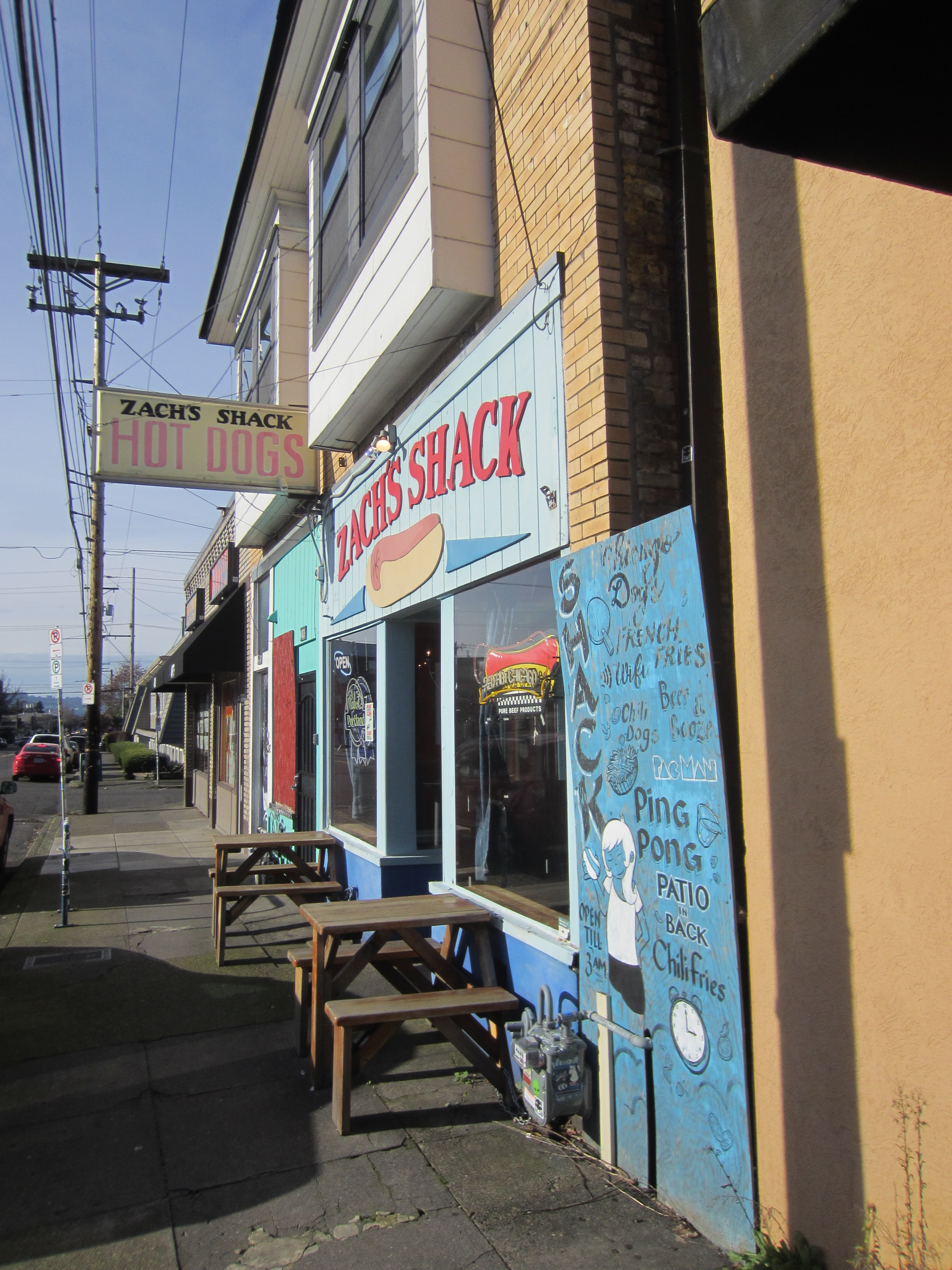
- The restaurant's exterior, 2021
- Interactive map of Zach's Shack

Restaurant information
- Established: 2004
- Owner: Zach Zelinger
- Location: 4611 Southeast Hawthorne Boulevard, Portland, Multnomah, Oregon, 97215, United States
- Coordinates: 45.5121°N 122.6149°W
- Website: zachsshack.com

Zach's Shack is a dive bar and hot dog restaurant in Portland, Oregon, United States.

== Description ==
Zach's Shack is a dive bar and hot dog restaurant on Hawthorne Boulevard in southeast Portland's Sunnyside neighborhood. Thom Hilton of Eater Portland has described Zach's Shack as "punk rock, divey, counter-service restaurant" with a wide selection of hot dog variations. Thrillist has described the restaurant as "a friendly, nabe-y dive that specializes in cheap drinks, warm service, and super dogs (filled with cheese or topped with anything you can imagine) that are best eaten late-night". Douglas Perry of The Oregonian has said of Zach's Shack and its clientele, "This narrow storefront with a corner tavern feel is usually jammed with pierced and tattooed twentysomethings seeking cheap eats and a pint of microbrew. But everyone is warmly welcomed."

Hot dogs are named after the owner's favorite rock musicians. The Sgt. Peppers has brown mustard and three varieties of peppers. The Chicago Dog has yellow mustard, relish, peppers, a pickle spear, onion, and celery salt, and the New York Dog has chili, cheese, and onion. The Grateful Dog has tomatoes, cucumbers, onions, and celery salt. The Dylan Dog has cream cheese and tomato and the Los Lobos Dog has black olives and jalapeños. The menu has also included cheese fries and Jello shots.

== History ==
Owner Zach Zelinger opened Zach's Shack in 2004. The business hosts an annual hot dog eating competition.

== Reception ==
Douglas Perry included the restaurant in The Oregonian's 2008 list of Portland's best hot dogs. The newspaper's Michael Zusman wrote, "Most specialty vendors in Portland sling first-rate dogs, but 'best in show' goes to Zach's on account of the franks and, frankly, the vibe - a welcoming storefront usually jammed with tattooed twentysomethings."

In 2012, Chris Onstad of the Portland Mercury called Zach's Shack "beloved and timeless". Drew Tyson included the business in Thrillist's 2015 list of "The 12 Best Hot Dog Spots in Portland". He wrote, "thanks to an evolving menu and the fact it stays open late, it's become one of the best dives on Hawthorne". Portland Monthly has recommended the Grateful Dog and said, "Fans of exotic wieners will be pleased as punch with the variety of dog offered at this hippie-themed Hawthorne dive". The magazine's Katherine Chew Hamilton and Nick Campigli included the restaurant in a 2021 list of "7 Must-Try Hot Dog Hotspots", writing:

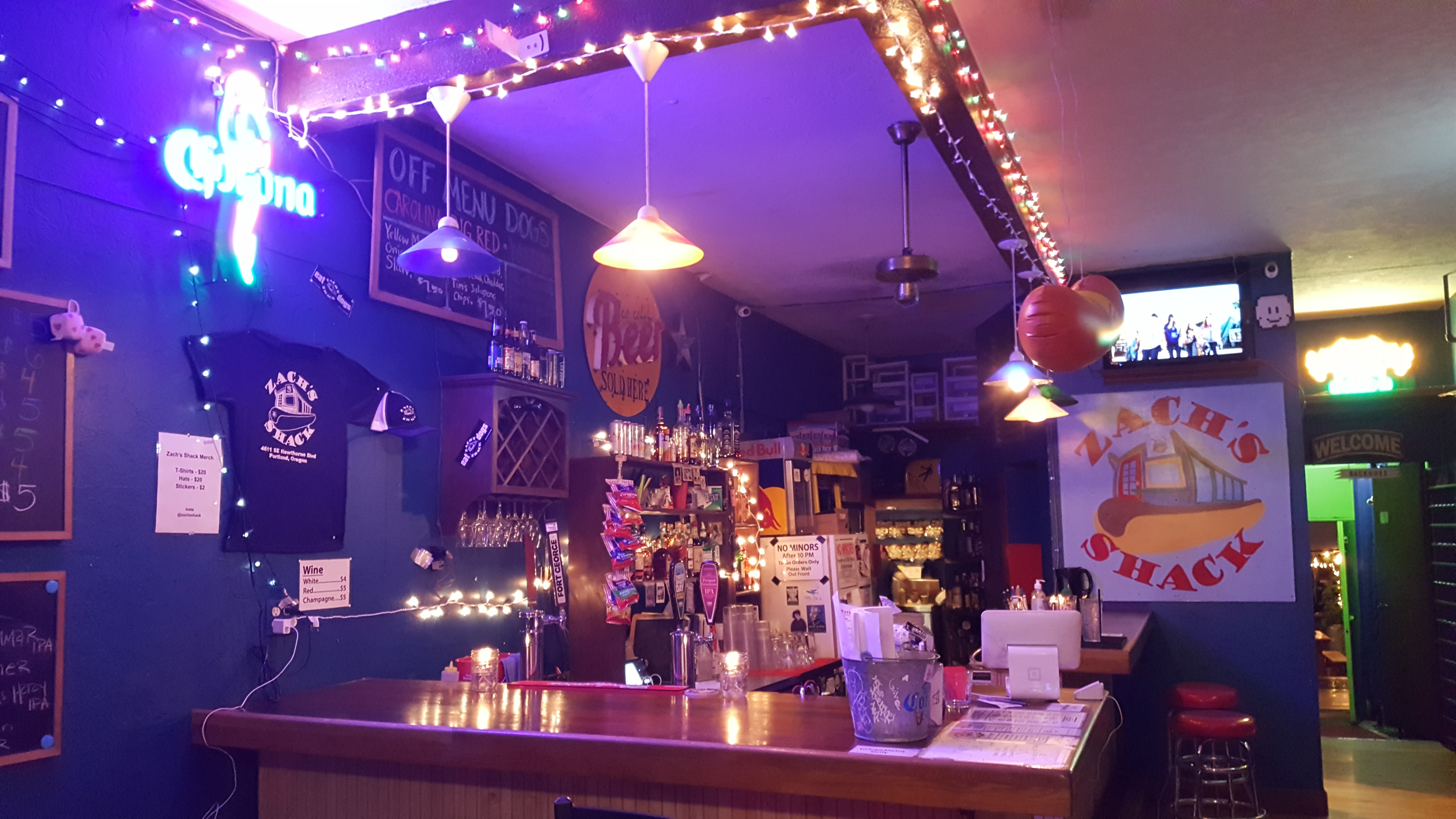
Interior, 2022

Equal parts dive bar and hot dog shop, this is my go-to for one of the closest reproductions of the Chicago-style hot dog I’ve had on the West Coast. What it gets right: the boiled beef dog, the pickle spears, the neon relish, the diced white onion, the sport peppers (few places nail this part), the celery salt, the poppy-seed bun, the dogs sourced from Chicago, no ketchup within a mile radius. (Substitute a tofu dog or turkey dog if you’d like.) It satisfies that itch without needing to fly into O’Hare, and what’s more, you can play ping pong on the patio and drink a tallboy Rainier while you’re at it, too.

In 2017, Zach's Shack was a runner-up in the Best Hot Dog category and won third place in the Best Place to Play Pingpong category in Willamette Week's annual Best of Portland readers' poll. In 2022, Thom Hilton and Nathan Williams included the business in Eater Portland's 2022 lists of "14 Spots for Late-Night Dining in Portland" and "17 Places Serving Portland's Finest Hot Dogs", respectively. Williams also included Zach's Shack in a 2023 list of the city's "snappiest, juiciest" hot dogs.

== See also ==
- List of dive bars
- List of hot dog restaurants
