= Carney's =

Restaurant in Los Angeles, California, U.S.

Coordinates: 34°5′45″N 118°22′18″W

- Interactive map of Carney's

Restaurant information
- Location: 8351 Sunset Blvd, Los Angeles, California, 90069, United States
- Website: www.carneytrain.com

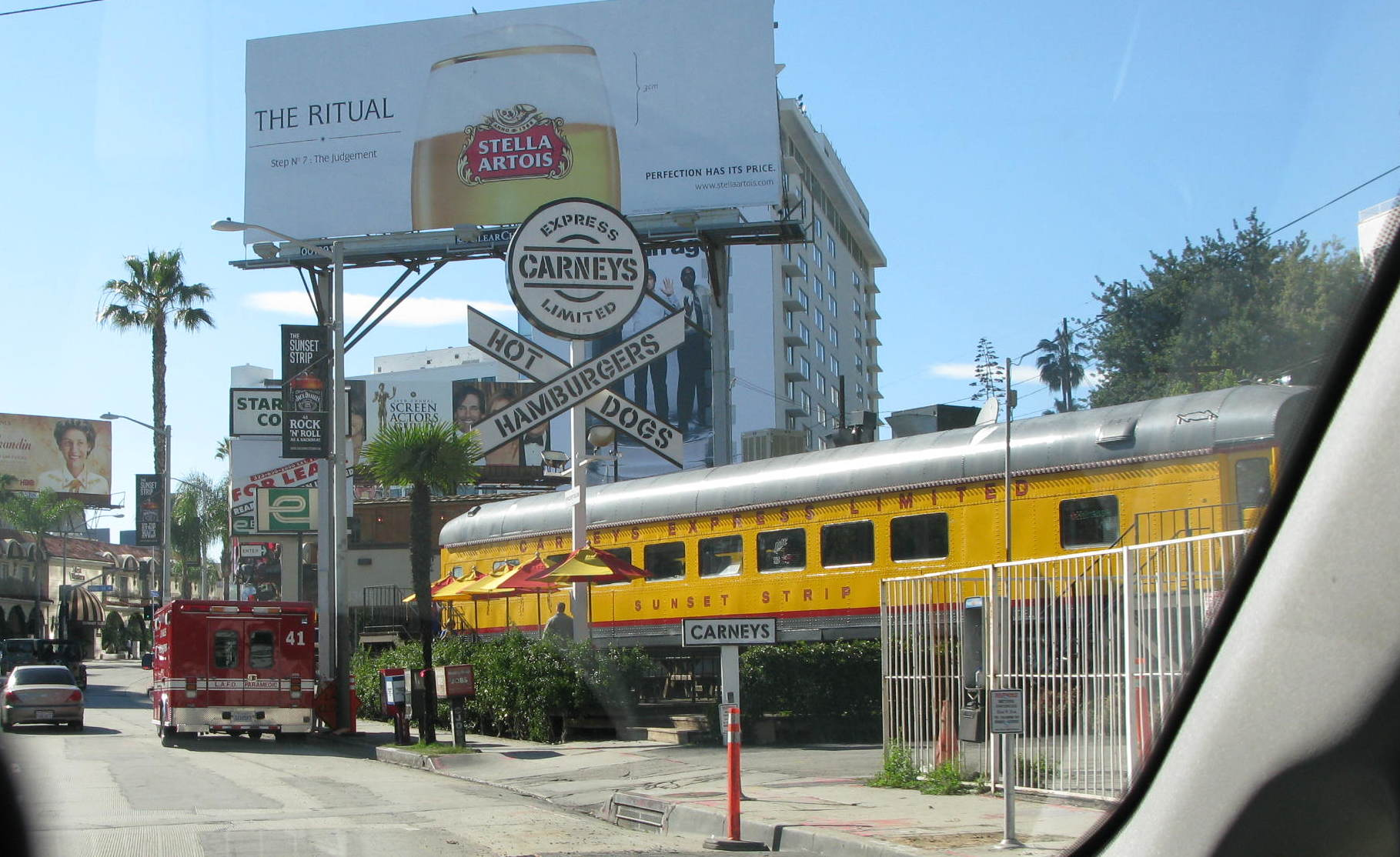
Carney's restaurant in 2010

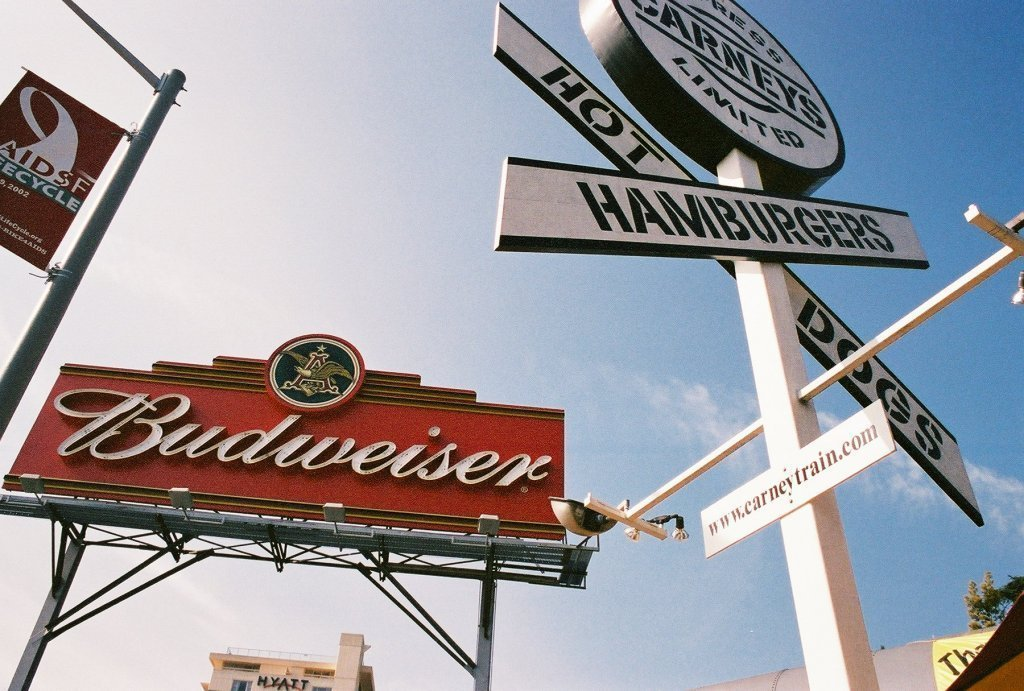
Carney's signage

Carney's is a hot dog and burger restaurant in a yellow Union Pacific rail car on Sunset Boulevard in Los Angeles, California. It was brought to the site in 1978.

A second Carney's, also in train cars, is located on Ventura Boulevard in Studio City. A crackdown on weekly biker meetings at that location caused controversy.

Carney's was featured in the video games Midnight Club: Los Angeles and Grand Theft Auto V (as "Last Train in Los Santos" restaurant).

KTVU movie critic Bob Shaw was fond of Carney's burgers. Carney's serves a chocolate-dipped frozen banana on a stick for dessert.

Pulitzer prize-winning LA restaurant critic Jonathan Gold put Carney's on his list of 99 essential Los Angeles restaurants and wrote that,

"Carney’s is a restaurant in the real Los Angeles tradition, two ancient Union Pacific cars transported to West Hollywood at great expense and mounted overlooking the Strip, where a mad parade of bass players and catalog models, hustlers and high school kids, movie guys and industry suits stare out the windows of the old bus, onto the profusion of German tourists and Japanese cars that flow down this section of Sunset so steadily that after a few beers and a chili dog or two, the train can appear to be lurching down the track."

== See also ==
- List of hamburger restaurants
- List of hot dog restaurants
