= Nick's Famous Coney Island =

Restaurant in Portland, Oregon, U.S.

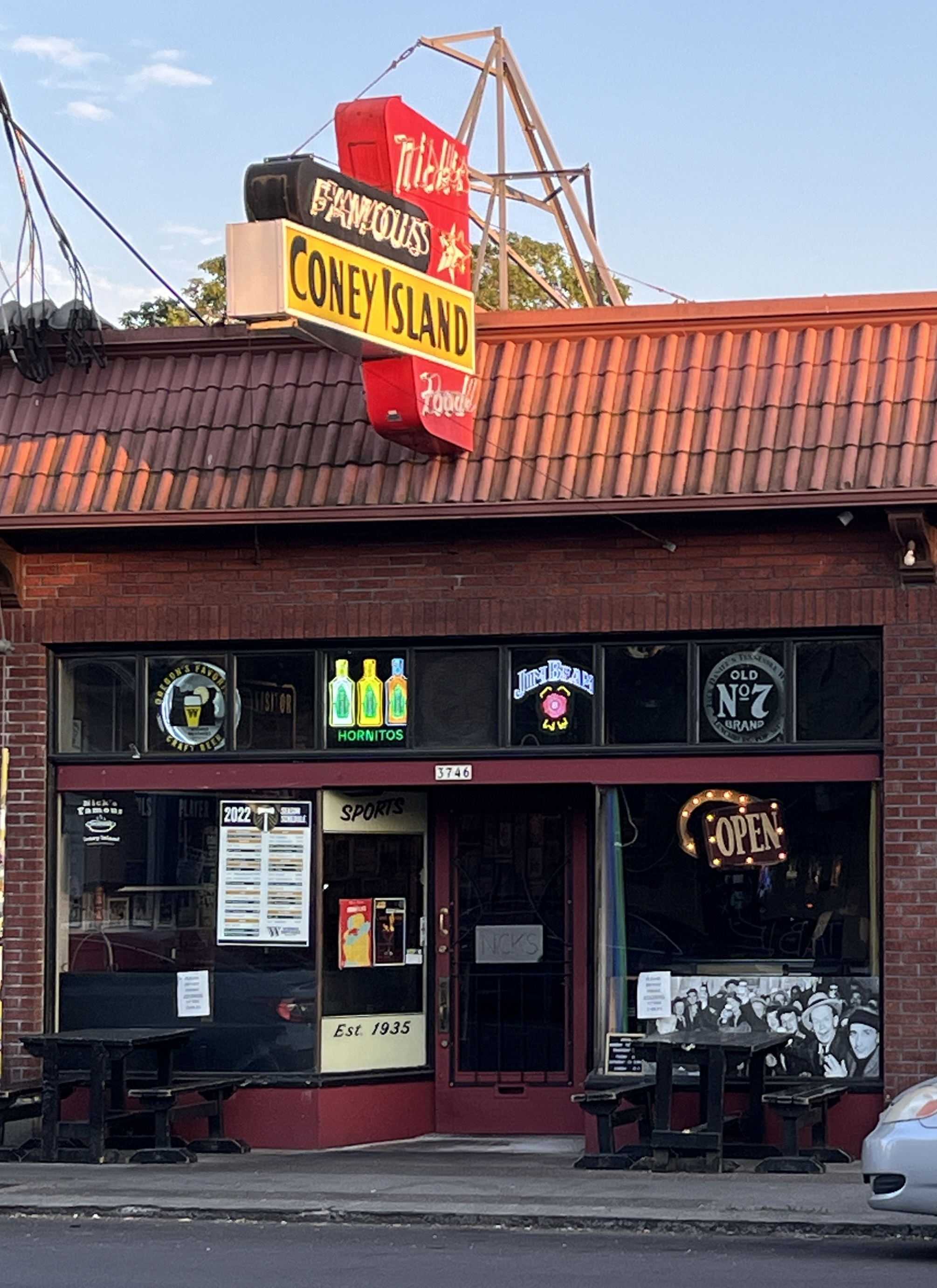
- The restaurant's exterior in 2022
- Interactive map of Nick's Famous Coney Island

Restaurant information
- Food type: American
- Location: 3746 Southeast Hawthorne Bouevard, Portland, Multnomah, Oregon, 97214
- Coordinates: 45.5119°N 122.6249°W

Nick's Famous Coney Island is a dive bar and restaurant in Portland, Oregon, United States.

== Description ==
Andi Prewitt of Willamette Week has described Nick's as Hawthorne's "most iconic hot dog bar", most known for its "chili-and-onion-smothered franks".

== History ==
Nick Carlascio opened Nick's Famous Coney Island in 1935, and relocated to its current location in 1942. Frank Nudo, who worked at the restaurant, purchased Nick's in 1960. He retired in 2008, and died in 2017.

Dave Bertelo and Nick Brown purchased the business in 2019. They painted the interior during the COVID-19 pandemic.

== Reception ==
Erin DeJesus of Eater Portland included the restaurant's Coney Island Dog in her 2014 list of 18 of Portland's "iconic meat dishes". The website's Nathan Williams included Nick's Famous Coney Island in a 2023 list of the city's "snappiest, juiciest" hot dogs.

In The Oregonian's 2020 list of Portland's 40 best inexpensive restaurants", Michael Russell wrote, "It's easy to love Nick's, with its friendly bartenders, old-school ambiance and decor little touched by the decades ... Changes are to be made gently here, if at all."

== See also ==
- Coney Island (restaurant)
- List of dive bars
- List of hot dog restaurants
