= Franks-A-Lot =

Hot dog restaurant in Portland, Oregon, U.S.

- The restaurant's exterior in 2022
- Interactive map of Franks-A-Lot

Restaurant information
- Location: 2845 East Burnside Street, Portland, Multnomah, Oregon, 97214, United States
- Coordinates: 45.5232°N 122.6362°W

Franks-A-Lot, or Franks A Lot, is a hot dog restaurant in Portland, Oregon, United States. Previously, the business operated as The Dog House.

== Description ==
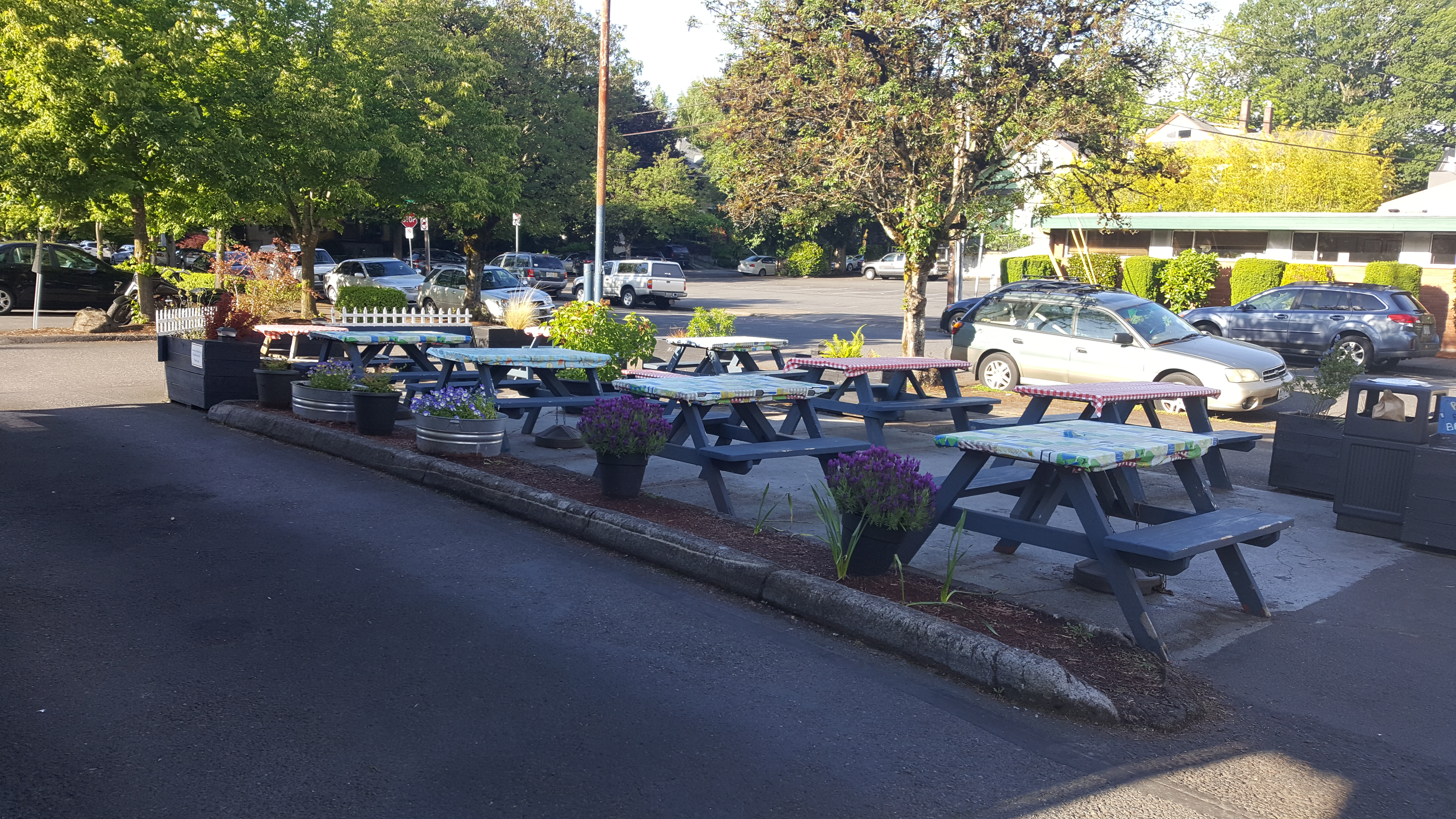
Outdoor seating, 2022

Franks-A-Lot is a restaurant in the Whole Foods parking lot on East Burnside Street in the Kerns neighborhood. Housed in a small A-frame cottage, the restaurant has "always focused on quick, take-away, drive-thru dogs", according to Thrillist.

In 2022, Nathan Williams of Eater Portland described the cottage as "faux-Bavarian" and said the business serves "jumbo-sized" hot dogs and hand-made milkshakes. There are seven outdoor tables for seating, only one of which is covered, as of 2022.

=== Menu ===
The menu has included the Great American Frank, the Long Wiener Frank (a longer version of a standard hot dog), and Chicago-style hot dogs with or without toppings, as well as German sausages, polish hot dogs, and vegetable franks. The Jumbo American has sweet-hot mustard, jalapeños, and sauerkraut. There are vegan options as well.

In 2014, Samantha Bakall of The Oregonian said the restaurant "has the vibe of a Chicago joint" and described the Chicago-style hot dog as an "all-beef frank topped with yellow mustard, relish, cucumbers, red onions, sport peppers, fresh tomato slices and celery salt".

== History ==
The restaurant was previously known as The Dog House.

== Reception ==
Douglas Perry included Franks-A-Lot in The Oregonian's 2008 overview of Portland's best hot dogs. Drew Tyson included the business in Thrillist's 2015 list of Portland's twelve best hot dog eateries and recommended the Long Wiener Frank. Franks-A-Lot had a rating of four stars based on 124 Yelp reviews, as of 2019. Eater Portland's Nathan Williams included the restaurant in a 2022 list of seventeen "places serving Portland's finest hot dogs" and 2023 list of the city's "snappiest, juiciest" hot dogs.

== See also ==
- List of hot dog restaurants
