= The Munch Box (restaurant) =

Fast food restaurant in Chatsworth, California, U.S.

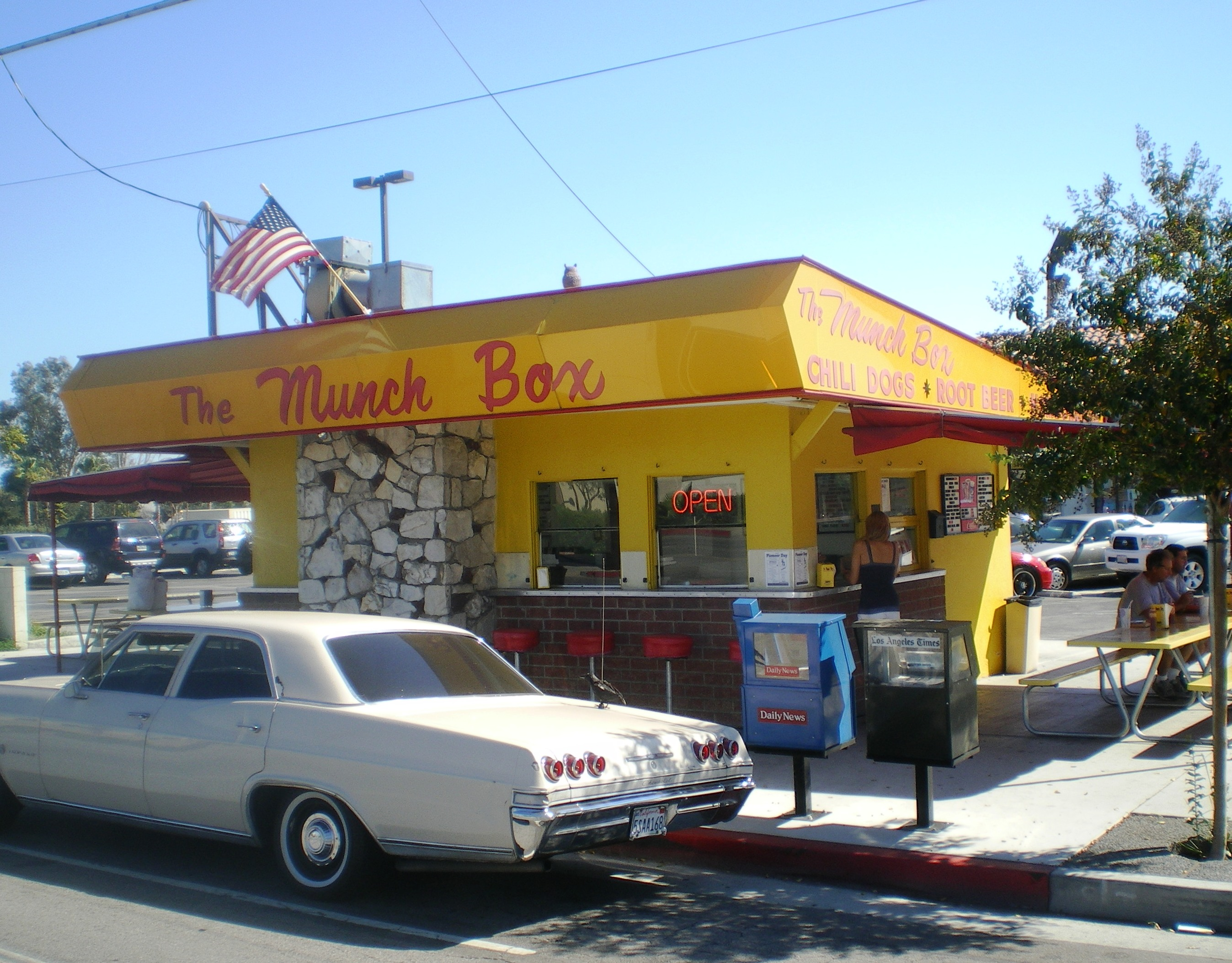
- The restaurant in 2008

Restaurant information
- Established: 1956; 70 years ago
- Owner: Buck Barker
- Food type: Fast food
- Location: 21532 Devonshire Street, Chatsworth, California, 91311
- Seating capacity: Outdoor seating only

The Munch Box is a 300-square-foot fast food restaurant located in Chatsworth, California, U.S. that opened in 1956. In 2003, the City of Los Angeles listed The Munch Box as a Los Angeles Historic-Cultural Monument.

== History ==
The Munch Box was founded in 1956. It has been owned and operated by the same family, retains the same googie architecture and has nearly the same menu consisting of hamburgers, hot dogs and french fries.

Development threatened to close the restaurant in the early 2000’s. Local residents wrote 1,700 letters to the Los Angeles City Council, urging that the burger stand be placed on the list of Cultural-Historical landmarks. In his motion to preserve the building, Councilman Hal Bernson wrote, “The landmark is an integral part of the old Chatsworth community and a direct link with its past. These types of establishments that once abounded virtually no longer exist and are only seen in old photographs or movie clips.” In June 2003, it was voted unanimously to be classified as Historic-Cultural Monument No. 750.

== In media ==
In October 2003, The Munch Box was featured on an episode of Visiting...with Huell Howser.

== See also ==
- List of hamburger restaurants
- List of hot dog restaurants
- List of Los Angeles Historic-Cultural Monuments in the San Fernando Valley
