= Pink's Hot Dogs =

Hot dog restaurant in Los Angeles

- Interactive map of Pink's Hot Dogs

Restaurant information
- Established: 1939
- Location: 709 North La Brea Avenue, Los Angeles, California, 90038, United States
- Coordinates: 34.083941°N 118.344391°W
- Website: www.pinkshollywood.com

Pink's Hot Dogs is a landmark hot dog restaurant in the Fairfax District of the city of Los Angeles. It is on North La Brea Avenue, across the street from the Hollywood district on the east.

== History ==
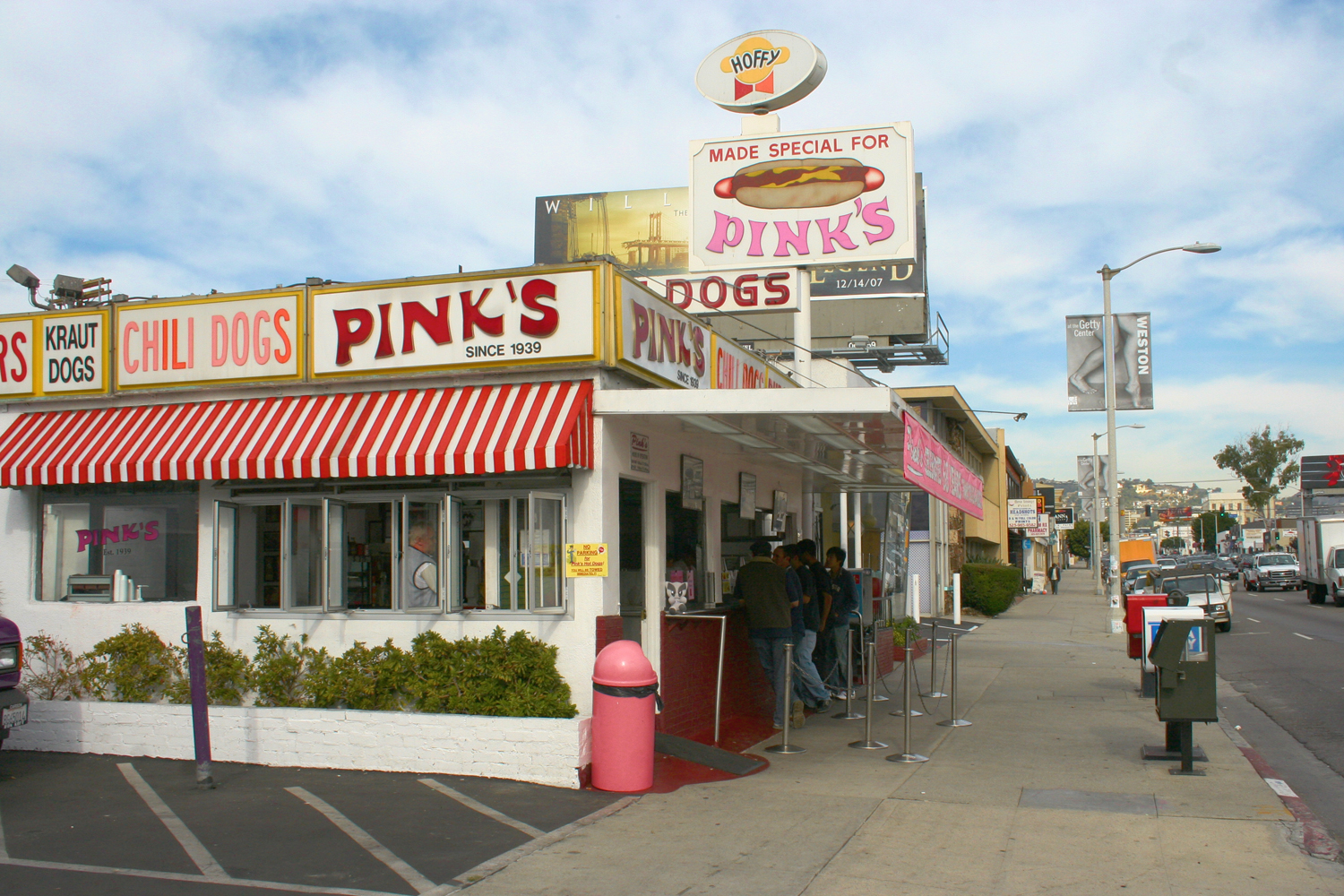
Pink's Hot Dogs

Pink's was founded by Paul and Betty Pink in 1939 as a pushcart near the corner of La Brea and Melrose. The Great Depression was still having an impact on the country and money was scarce. People could purchase a chili dog made with Betty's chili recipe accompanied by mustard and onions on a steamed bun for ten cents each. As the business grew, thanks to Betty's chili and the custom-made Hoffy-brand hot dogs, with their natural sausage casings, so did Pink's. The family built the current building in 1946 at 709 North La Brea Avenue in the Fairfax District.

== Today ==
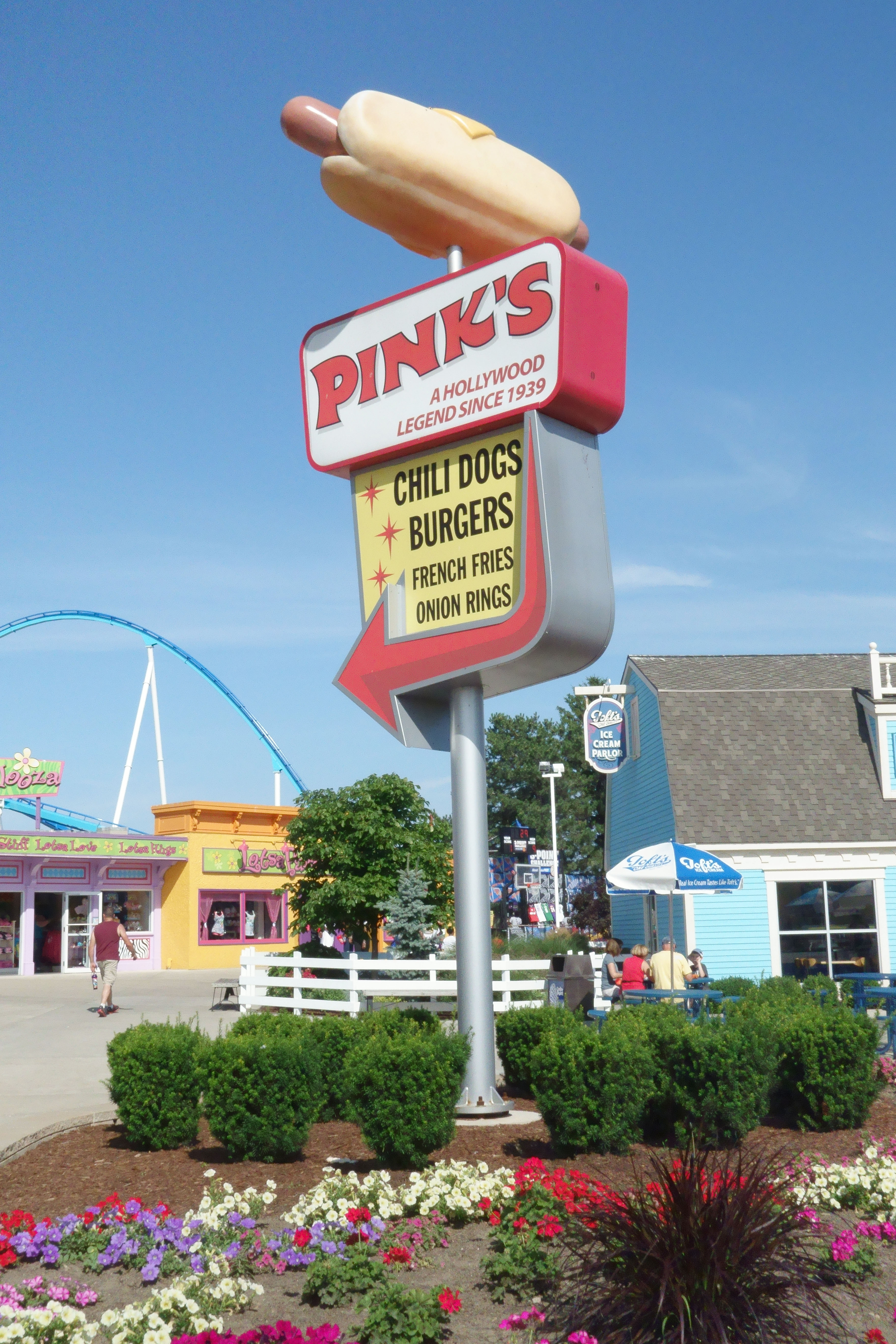
Pink's sign at Cedar Point in Sandusky, Ohio

Pink's has named several newer menu items after Hollywood celebrities, some of whom can be seen at the restaurant. Numerous signed celebrity photographs are hanging on the walls inside; some celebrities have signed more than one photo. The celebrity-named hot dogs are often versions ordered by the person in question, such as the "Martha Stewart Dog" with mustard, relish, onions, chopped tomatoes, sauerkraut, bacon, and sour cream. Another is the "Rosie O'Donnell Long Island Dog", which is a 10" dog topped with mustard, onions, chili, and sauerkraut. The "Huell Howser Dog" is a standard chili dog with two of the regular hot dogs on a single bun while the "Ozzy Spicy Dog" named for Ozzy Osbourne features a Polish sausage, nacho cheese, American cheese, grilled onions, guacamole and chopped tomatoes.

A smaller selection of hamburgers are available, and desserts are a choice of coconut or marble cake.

There is usually a long line of customers in front despite the lack of parking in the area. The often slow-moving line is viewed by some as part of the attraction at Pink's, especially on Friday and Saturday nights when the stand becomes packed with club and concertgoers.

Pink's has a parking lot attendant, even though parking is free. According to the menu, Pink's original signature chili dog, with a measure of ten inches (25.4 centimeters), remains the stand's top seller.

During the Los Angeles Dodgers' World Series run against the Houston Astros in 2017, the restaurant changed its name to Blue's and repainted its pink and white facade for the first time in 78 years, making it blue and white and featuring Dodger logos and player names on the windows. They also challenged Good Dog Houston, a Texas-based hot dog stand, to a friendly bet. The winner would give out 250 free hot dogs courtesy of the losing city's hot dog stand. But the Astros won the series. The restaurant named itself Blue's again when the Dodgers made it to the World Series for the team's battles against the Boston Red Sox in 2018, the Tampa Bay Rays in 2020, the New York Yankees in 2024 and Toronto Blue Jays in 2025; the Dodgers won the latter three series.

In mid-March 2020, caused by the COVID-19 pandemic, as with other restaurants, its locations indefinitely shut down indoor dine-ins. Pink's flagship location closed between mid-March to mid-August 2020 and shut down again from January 4 to February 2021.

=== Other locations ===
In September 2009, a location opened on the Las Vegas Strip at the Planet Hollywood Hotel & Casino.

Pink’s at Universal CityWalk

In April 2010, another location opened at Universal CityWalk and introduced "The Betty White Naked Dog" (no condiments or toppings). In November 2010, a location opened at Harrah's Rincon in Valley Center. It was closed in 2018 and replaced with a Smashburger.

On June 10, 2016, Pink's opened their first international location at the Shangri-La at the Fort, Manila in Bonifacio Global City, Taguig in the Philippines.

In October 2016, Pink's opened an additional location at the Del Amo Fashion Center food court in Torrance, California. In 2025, It was replaced with Uncle Sharkii, a poke bowl brand based in Hawaii.

On February 22, 2019, Pink's opened their first East Coast location at the King of Prussia Mall in King of Prussia, Pennsylvania.

Pink's hot dogs have also been sold at amusement parks—from 2011 to 2018 at Cedar Point in Sandusky, Ohio, the first Pink's location east of Las Vegas, and since 2014 at Lake Compounce in Bristol, Connecticut.

There are also locations inside the Los Angeles International Airport (LAX), the Kia Forum, and the T-Mobile Arena. In June 2018, locations had opened at Brea Mall (but had closed in 2024) and the Camarillo Premium Outlets (but closed four years later).

== In popular culture ==
- The original Pink's location is the subject of an episode of the satirical reality television series Nathan for You. In the episode, host Nathan Fielder convinces Richard and Gloria Pink to institute a policy that allows customers to jump the line in the event of an emergency. When Fielder requests permission to seek vengeance on a customer he learns lied about going to a doctor's appointment, the Pinks fire him.
- The location becomes a hangout of the main characters in the novel Tomorrow, and Tomorrow, and Tomorrow following their relocation from New England to California.
- Mentioned by Artie in The Larry Sanders Show Season 4 Episode 6 20:26.
- In season 1 of The Lincoln Lawyer, Mickey Haller eats a chili dog at Pink's with a client.
- In Walter Mosley's 2016 novel Charcoal Joe set in 1968, the private detective Easy Rawlins visits a Pink's location.
- Slapstick comedy series Jackass features a hidden camera prank where the cast of the show kidnaps Brad Pitt standing in line at Pink's in front of shocked bystanders.

== See also ==
- List of hot dog restaurants
