= Rachel's Ginger Beer =

Company based in Seattle, Washington, U.S.

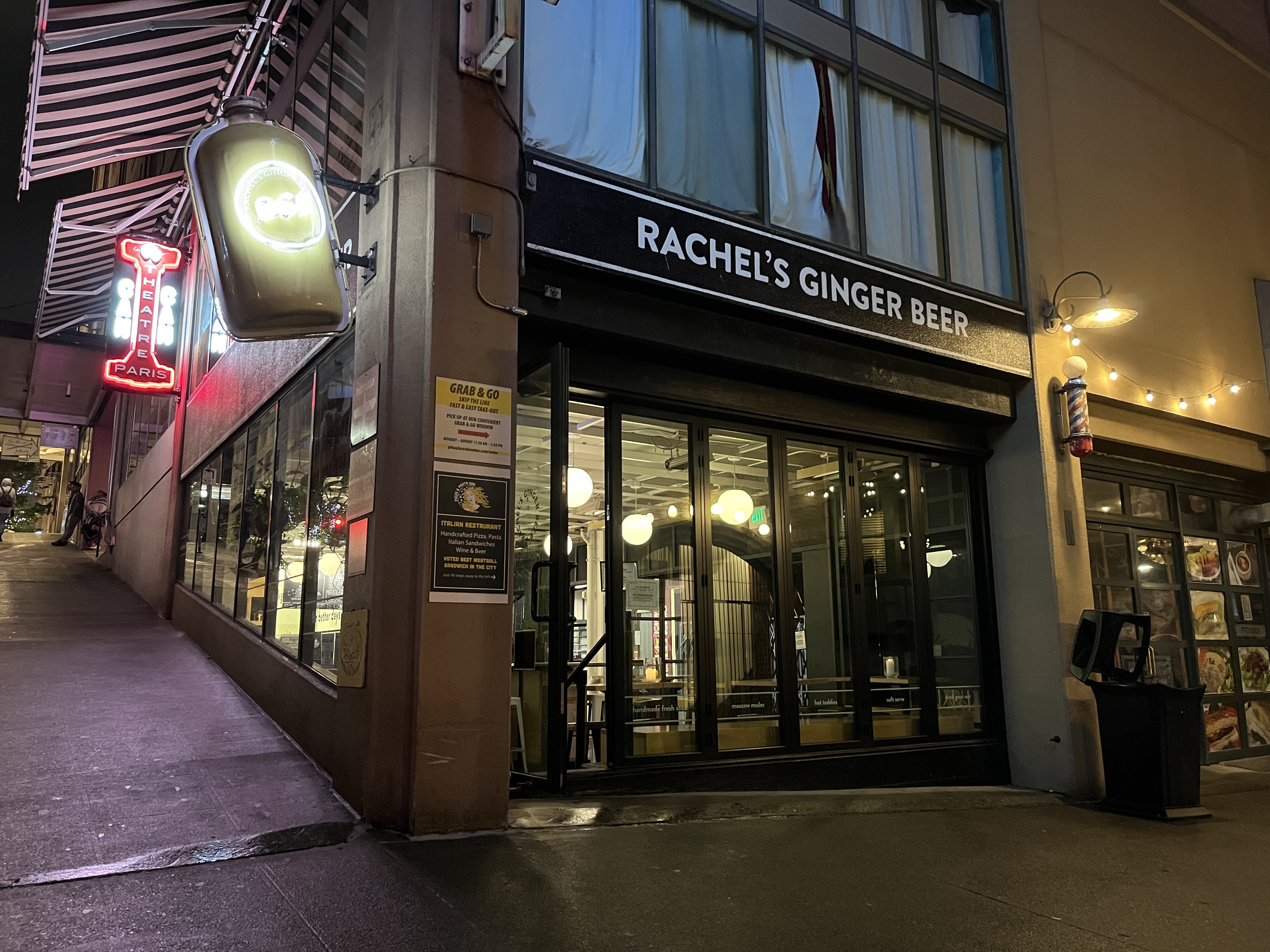
- Exterior of the flagship store at Pike Place Market in 2022

Restaurant information
- Location: Seattle, Washington, United States

Rachel's Ginger Beer (RGB) is a ginger beer company based in Seattle, in the U.S. state of Washington. As of 2015, the company had 80 employees, a flagship store at Pike Place Market, two additional bars, and a 2,500-square-foot production facility in south Seattle.

== History ==
Rachel Marshall, a Whidbey Island resident, started making ginger beer after she was introduced to it in Germany. She returned to Seattle and started selling ginger beer at local farmers' markets and as a stand at Pike Place Market.

Marshall opened a permanent Rachel's Ginger Beer store at Pike Place Market in July 2013 with help from her partner Adam Peters. Marshall was a co-owner of two bars in Seattle with Kate Opatz and named one of 50 "most influential" people in Seattle by Seattle Metropolitan in 2013.

The business began operating on Capitol Hill in 2015, at University Village in the University District in 2017, and in Denny Triangle in 2019. Stacey Rozich, a Seattle based artists, designed murals for all four locations. RGB has also operated in Portland, Oregon. This location closed after two years because it did not generate enough profit and stretched the companies resources much too thin.
