= Washington Mall =

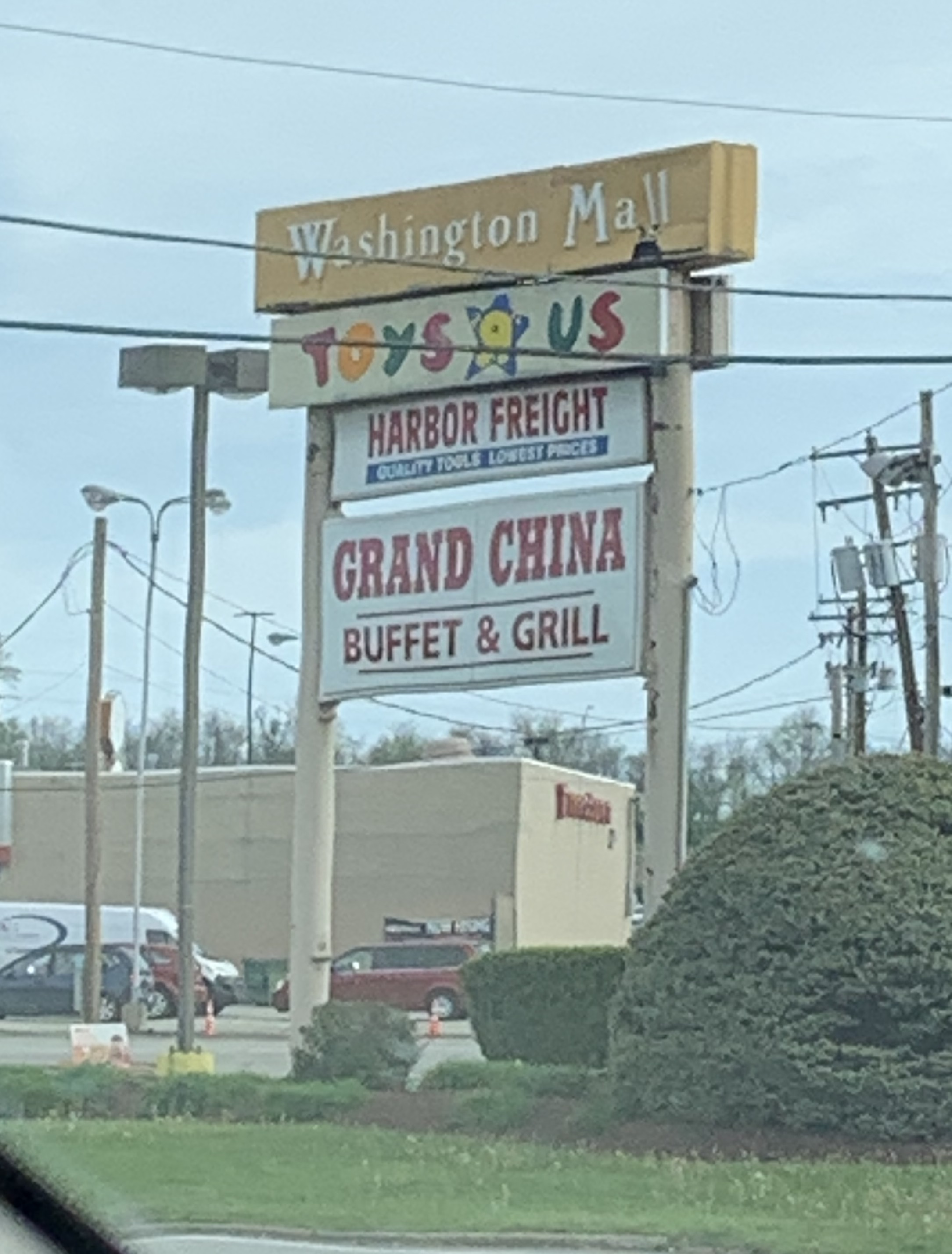
- The mall's signage in April 2026
- Location: Washington, Pennsylvania, United States
- Coordinates: 40.185°N 80.235°W
- Opened: October 17, 1968
- Closed: July 2014
- Developer: Falconi
- Manager: Oxford Development Company
- Num. of anchor tenants: 2
- Floors: 1 (3 in former JCPenney, partial lower level in former Toys R Us/Giant Eagle section)

Washington Mall was an enclosed shopping mall located in South Strabane Township, Washington County, Pennsylvania, United States, just outside the city of Washington. The property was managed by J. J. Gumberg Co. and later by Chapman Business Properties. It was owned by 79/70 Associates, a local developer with numerous holdings throughout Washington County.

== History ==
Washington Mall opened on October 17, 1968, with a total of 45 stores. The mall was anchored by J. C. Penney, which had a freestanding auto center. The mall also featured G. C. Murphy, a Thorofare Grocery Store, and Giant Eagle as junior anchors. There was also a partial lower-level under one end of the building that housed a two-screen movie theater. Around 1987, a two-level expansion containing Toys R Us and Jo-Ann Fabrics (upper level) and a new, larger space for Giant Eagle (lower level, also including the old theater) was built. Toys R Us and Giant Eagle were only accessible from the outside. The original Giant Eagle space at the opposite end of the mall became Pottery Factory Outlet, and the original lower level movie theater was replaced by a larger freestanding multiplex on the mall periphery. Staples was under construction in 1996, taking over what was originally the Marianne Shop. Around this time, the mall received minor cosmetic updates such as new flooring and paint, but few other changes were made. Thompson Hardware closed in June 1997 and was later replaced by Dollar General. Pottery Factory Outlet closed in February 1998. Giant Eagle closed in 1999; however, the company continued to pay its lease through 2001. Afterthoughts closed in December 1999, and Altmeyer closed that same year.

In 2001, JCPenney announced a remodel of its store, introducing housewares and custom decorating departments to the location. A REX store was also slated to open in the former Pottery Factory Outlet space, and a D&K Stores was planned to open next to Dollar General. At this time, the mall's Baskin-Robbins store closed and was converted to an independent shop called "Pap Pap's" Ice Cream after the owner cited inability to afford franchise fees. Plans were announced in 2004 to convert the mall into a more traditional shopping plaza, retaining anchors Staples, JCPenney, and Toys R Us, and adding an 88,000 sq ft space for a new anchor. However, these plans were ultimately delayed and never realized. JCPenney closed in February 2007 and relocated to the nearby Foundry shopping center less than a mile away in March 2007. However, owing to structural settling problems at that site and financial difficulties with the property owner, JCPenney returned to Washington Mall in mid-September 2008. On January 15, 2014, JCPenney announced its closure at Washington Mall as part of a nationwide plan to close 33 stores. The store closed in May 2014. From 2014 to 2017, the former JCPenney space was used seasonally as a Spirit Halloween store before being vacated. In July 2014, Jo-Ann Fabrics departed Washington Mall for the nearby Washington Crown Center. This marked the end of Washington Mall's active interior, as Jo-Ann Fabrics had been the last remaining interior tenant.

Toys R Us closed its Washington Mall location in the company's 2018 bankruptcy. Subsequently, the Washington Mall sign and the Imperial Cleaners sign were removed, and the former JCPenney area was fenced off to the boundary of Staples to deter trespassing. Between 2019 and 2022, the vacated space was used seasonally by Spirit Halloween. From 2022 to 2023, retail chain Gabe's used the former Toys R Us space as a distribution center, after which the space was vacated entirely. In February 2024, Staples closed after the property owner declined to bring the building up to code. By early 2024, only two stores remained open—Grand China Buffet and Harbor Freight Tools—both accessible only from the exterior.

Washington Mall was once the predominant retail destination in Washington. Until the 1990s, it held its own against competition. Its decline accelerated with the expansion and renovation of the competing Franklin Mall (now Washington Crown Center) and, later, the opening of a nearby Tanger Outlets center. The mall also lost tenants to newer power centers that opened nearby. By the mid-2000s, the mall was largely vacant and maintenance requirements were being neglected. By the early 2010s, the structure had deteriorated visibly and portions of the mall interior had been sealed off. Various outparcels and other stores around the mall remained occupied, and the detached cinema that was once associated with the mall closed in 2013 and was demolished in 2016.

In February 2025, plans to demolish the mall were announced. The former Toys R Us section was planned for renovation and conversion into a car dealership. Following asbestos removal, demolition began in July 2025, with a Costco planned for the site. By late September 2025, Neiswonger Construction had begun demolishing much of the mall interior, including the north wall. By December 2025, most of the central structure had been removed and demolition of the former JCPenney building was underway. On the southeast side, a new 6,000-square-foot Harbor Freight store was also under development.
