= Nu-Way Weiners =

Mallis Holdings, Inc. dba Nu-Way Weiners, Inc.

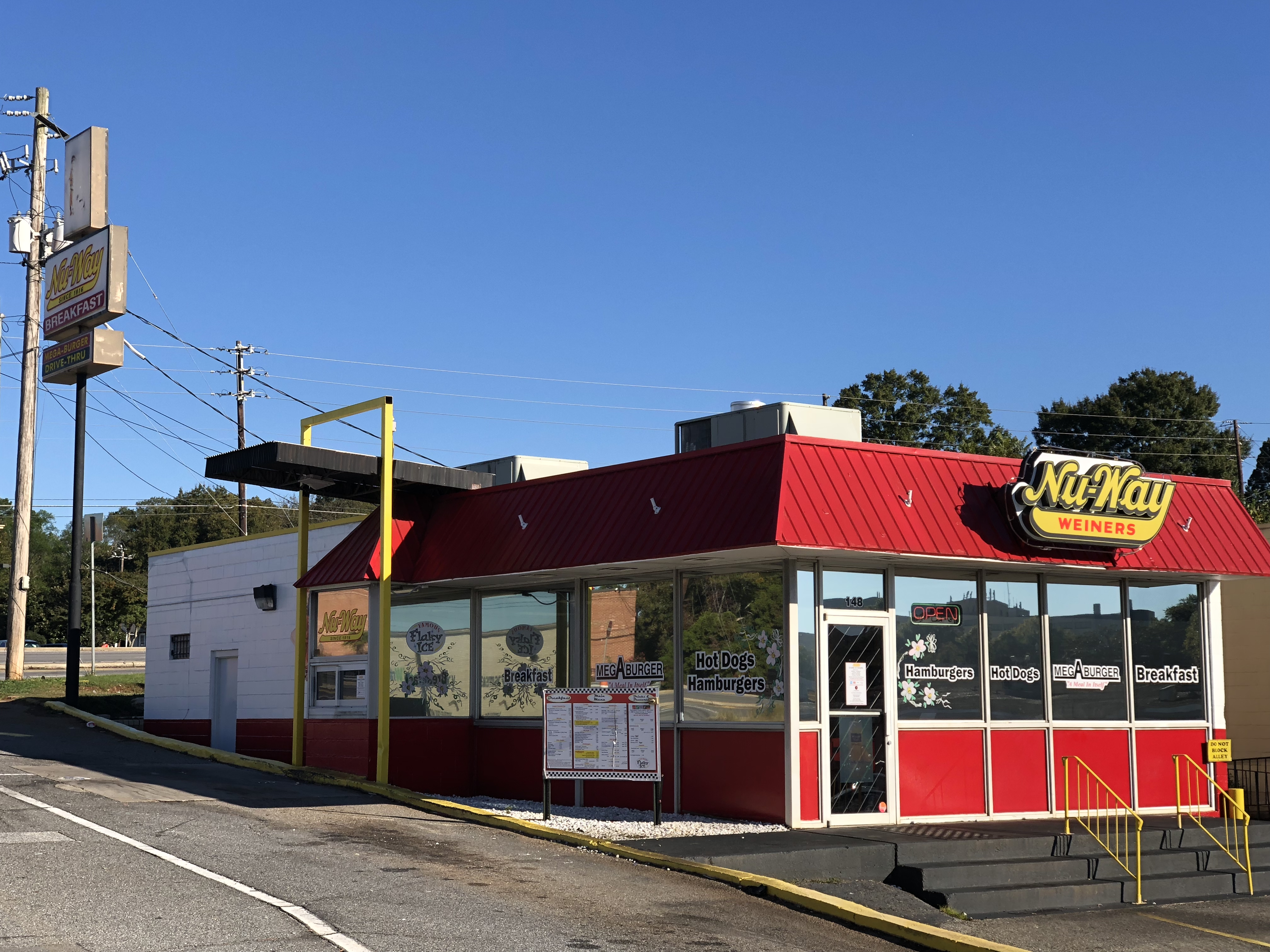
- Location #5 on Emery Highway in Macon
- Interactive map of Mallis Holdings, Inc. dba Nu-Way Weiners, Inc.

Restaurant information
- Established: 1916; 110 years ago
- Owners: James G. Cacavias, President, Spyros N.Dermatas, Vice President
- Food type: hotdogs, hamburgers, breakfast
- Location: P.O. Box 28887, Macon, Georgia, 31221-8887, United States
- Coordinates: 32°50′13″N 83°37′50″W
- Other locations: Central Georgia area
- Website: www.nu-wayweiners.com

Nu-Way Weiners, Inc., is a company that operates a chain of fast food restaurants in the Middle Georgia area. The first Nu-Way restaurant opened in Macon, Georgia, United States, on February 27, 1916, at 218 Cotton Avenue in downtown Macon. Nu-Way is known for its iconic hot dogs (or wieners, not the misspelled "weiners") – unique for their red color. Nu-Way also serves an extensive breakfast menu which includes egg platters, bacon & egg sandwiches, spicy dog biscuits, pancakes, etc. In addition Nu-Way is famous for their hamburgers which include their chili-burgers, cheeseburgers and Mega-Burgers (a deluxe quarter pounder).

As of 2023, eight (8) Nu-Way Weiner restaurants are in the Central Georgia area. The original location on Cotton Avenue was destroyed due to a catastrophic fire in March 2015. Nu-Way's slogan is "I'd Go a Long Way For a Nu-Way" and is a registered trademark of Nu-Way Weiners, Inc. Mega-Burger and Nu-Way are both registered trademarks.

== History ==
In 1916, Greek American immigrant James Mallis opened a hot dog stand in Macon named "Nu-Way Weiners." Established the same year as Nathan's Famous hot dog stand in New York City, Nu-Way is one of the oldest hot dog restaurants in the United States.

By 1962, three Nu-Way Weiner restaurants were in operation. Expansion, which included franchising, took the total to eight locations by 1972. Nu-Way developed a very loyal customer base with a taste for its hot dogs with chili sauce ("chili dogs") and hot dogs with cole slaw ("slaw dogs"). The New York Times declared Nu-Way to be the "king" of the slaw dog "hill".

During the morning hours of March 13, 2015, the original Cotton Avenue location was destroyed by fire. Fortunately, the iconic neon sign was saved from the blaze.

Food critics have praised Nu-Way for its authentic Southern American cuisine and nostalgic atmosphere. In November 2007, Nu-Way received widespread media attention when Oprah Winfrey visited the restaurant while in Macon to tape the annual Oprah's Favorite Things episode of The Oprah Winfrey Show. She claimed that Nu-Way was one of her favorite things about Macon.

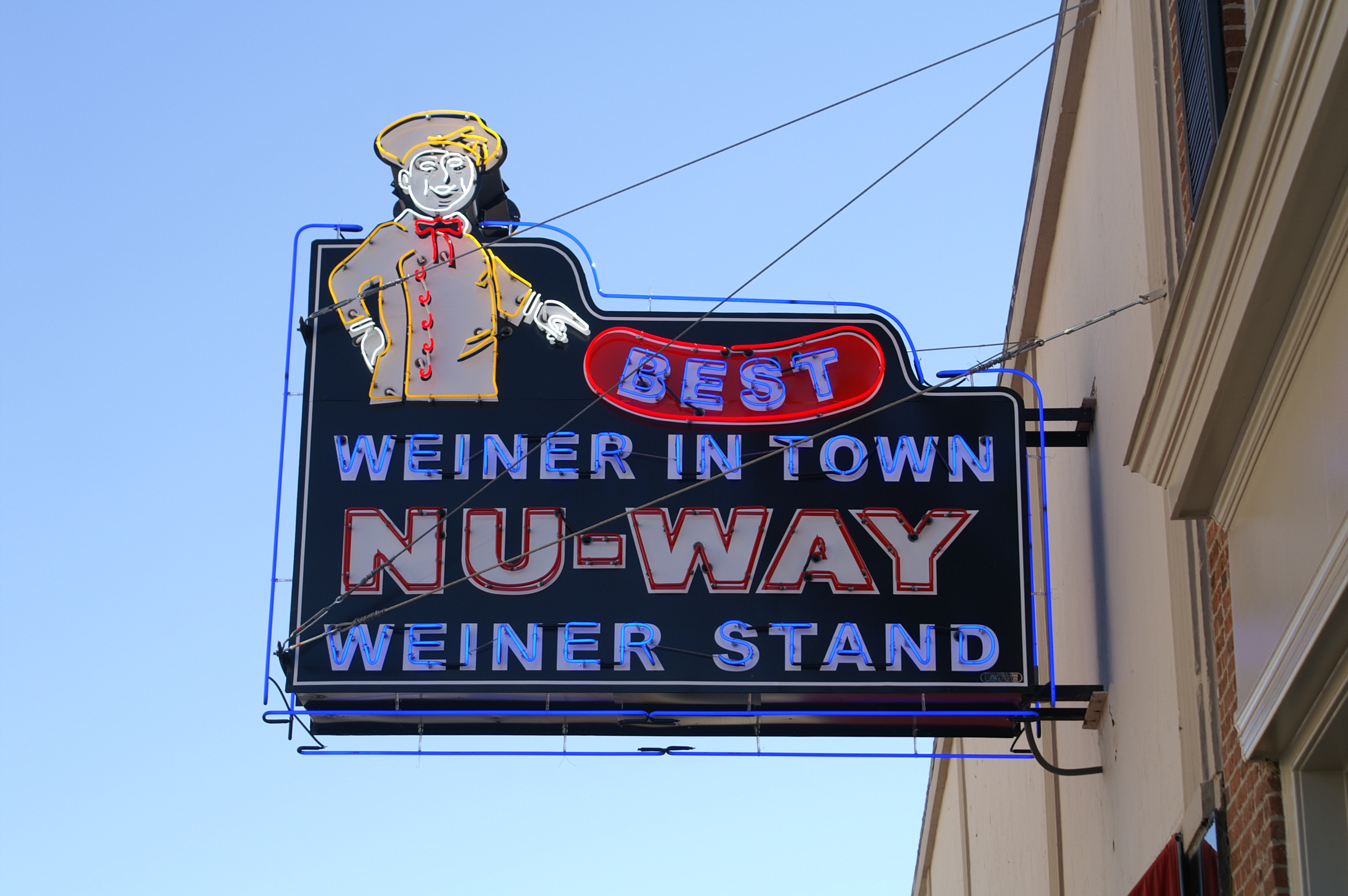
Decorative neon sign of Nu-Way

In 1999, Nu-Way was featured on a PBS special A Hot Dog Program. The program was a one-hour special that traveled to 20 locations in the United States, featuring "some of the finest hot dog houses in the country". Numerous other accolades have come from Southern Living Magazine, Gourmet Magazine, The Travel Channel, The Atlanta Journal-Constitution, Money Magazine, The Macon Telegraph, The Today Show on NBC, CNN, John T. Edge of the Southern Foodways Alliance with his book "Southern Belly", noted Southern humorist Lewis Grizzard, Georgia Trend Magazine, Every Day with Rachael Ray, and many others.

In 2012 author, Ed Grisamore, wrote the book, There Is More than One Way to Spell WIENER, The Story of Nu-Way, a detailed history of the company.

Nu-Way is owned and operated by James G. Cacavias and Spyros N. Dermatas, who are third generation owners.
