= Hot dog stand =

Type of food retail business

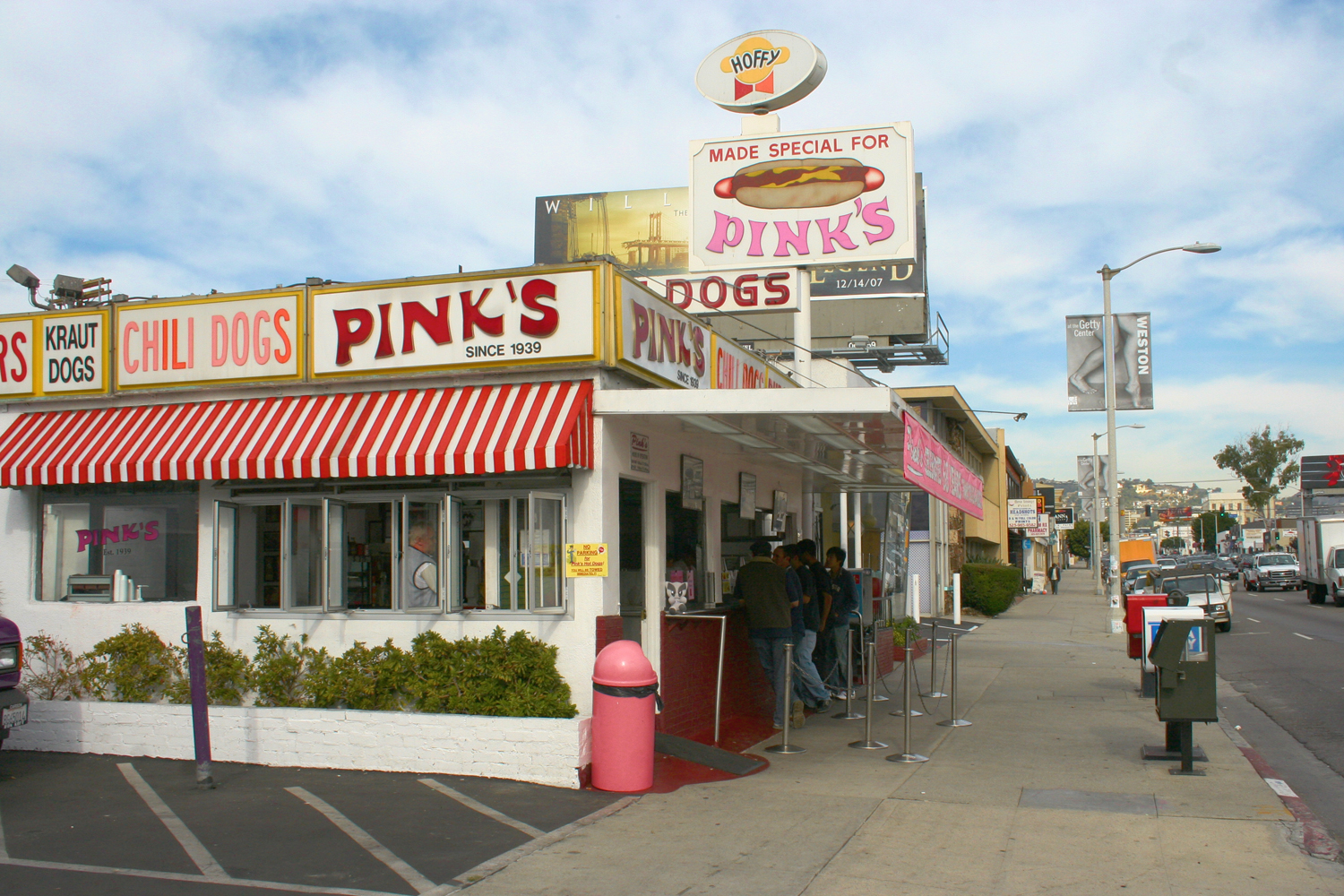
Pink's Hot Dogs in Hollywood. The current building dates to 1946.

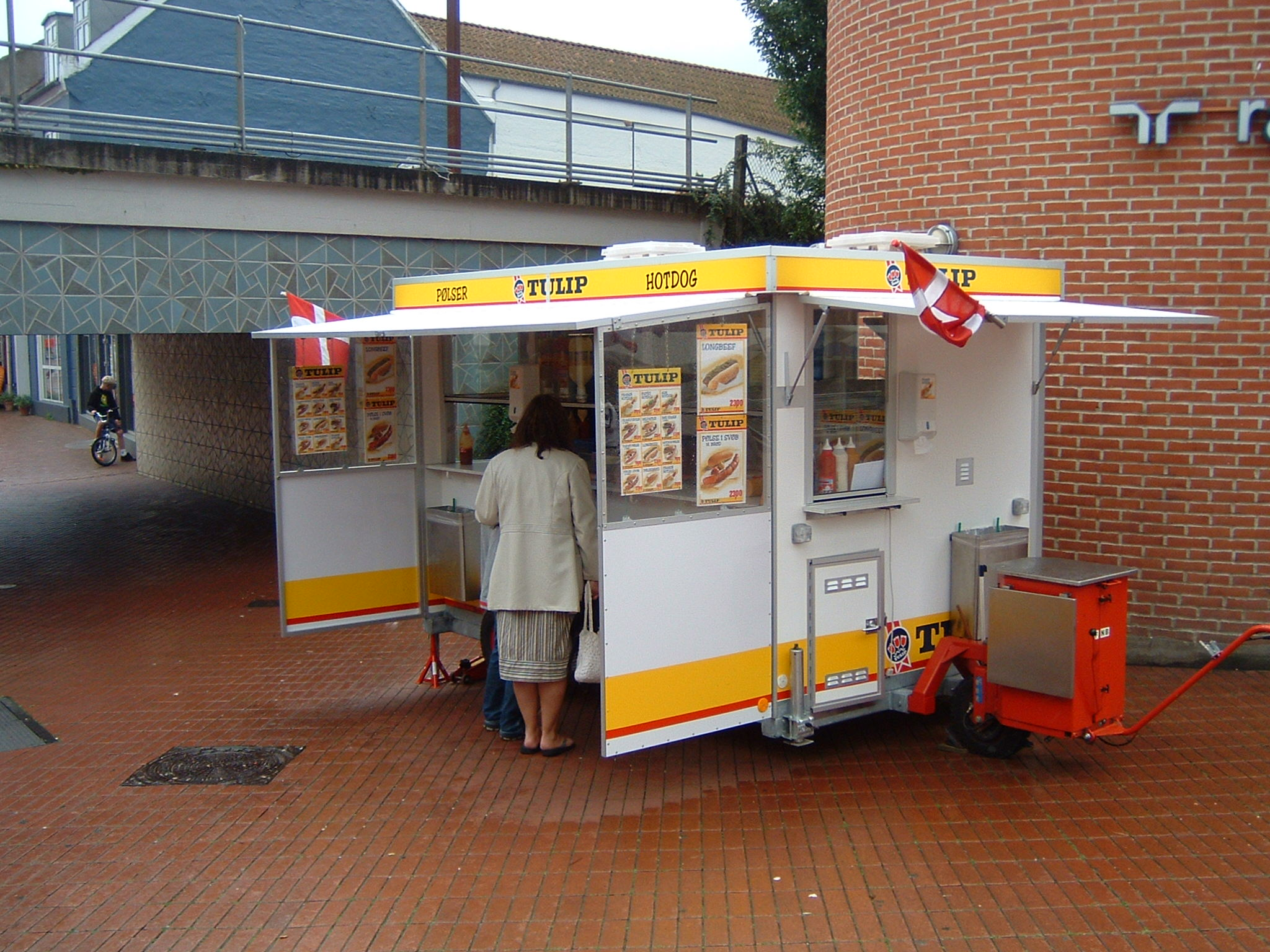
A Pølsevogn (sausage wagon) in Kolding, Denmark

A hot dog stand is a business that sells hot dogs, usually from an external counter. Hot dog stands can be located on a public thoroughfare, near a sports stadium, in a shopping mall, or at a fair. They are often found on the streets of major American cities. According to one report, some hot dog stands are paying up to $80,000 in rent for prime locations in Manhattan.

Similar businesses include hot dog carts or wagons, which are portable hand carts with a grill or boiler for cooking the hot dogs and keeping them hot. In the United States, hot dog carts are also referred to as hot dog stands. However, a hot dog stand is typically a permanent or semi-permanent structure, whereas a hot dog cart is movable. Similarly, hot dog trucks are motor vehicles that are set up at a roadside location, and often include a complete kitchen for storage and preparation.

In Denmark, hot dog stands are called Pølsevogn (sausage wagons). They serve traditional hot dogs as well as assorted sausages and sausage meats.

In Toronto, Canada, the hot dogs from hot dog stands are often called "street meat".

Windows 3.1 included a red and yellow desktop colour scheme titled "Hot Dog Stand". The garish pairing of bright red and yellow, described by one source as "roughly the ugliest, most abhorrent, most terrifying pile of mismatchery", has become something of a legend in coding circles, viewed as a rare joke by Microsoft.

== Notable stands ==
- Art's Famous Chili Dog Stand, Los Angeles, CA
- Bæjarins Beztu Pylsur, Reykjavík, Iceland
- Ben's Chili Bowl, Washington, D.C.
- Coney Island Colorado, Bailey, CO
- Dog n Suds, Grayslake, IL
- Essie's Original Hot Dog Shop, Pittsburgh, PA
- Gene & Jude's, River Grove, IL
- Gray's Papaya, Manhattan, NY
- Hot Dog King, Manhattan, NY
- Hillbilly Hot Dogs, Huntington, WV
- Hot Dog on a Stick, Santa Monica, CA
- Nathan's Famous, Coney Island, NY
- Papaya King, Manhattan, NY
- Rutt's Hut, Clifton, NJ
- Superdawg, Chicago, IL
- Tail o' the Pup, Los Angeles, CA
- The Varsity, Atlanta, GA
- Walkin' Dog, Minneapolis, MN
- Walter's Hot Dog Stand, Mamaroneck, NY
- Weenie Beenie, Arlington, VA
- The Wieners Circle, Chicago, IL

== Image gallery ==
As shown in these photos, hot dog stands exist in a very wide variety of building styles and configurations, and sometimes feature unusual or even outlandish architecture or signage.

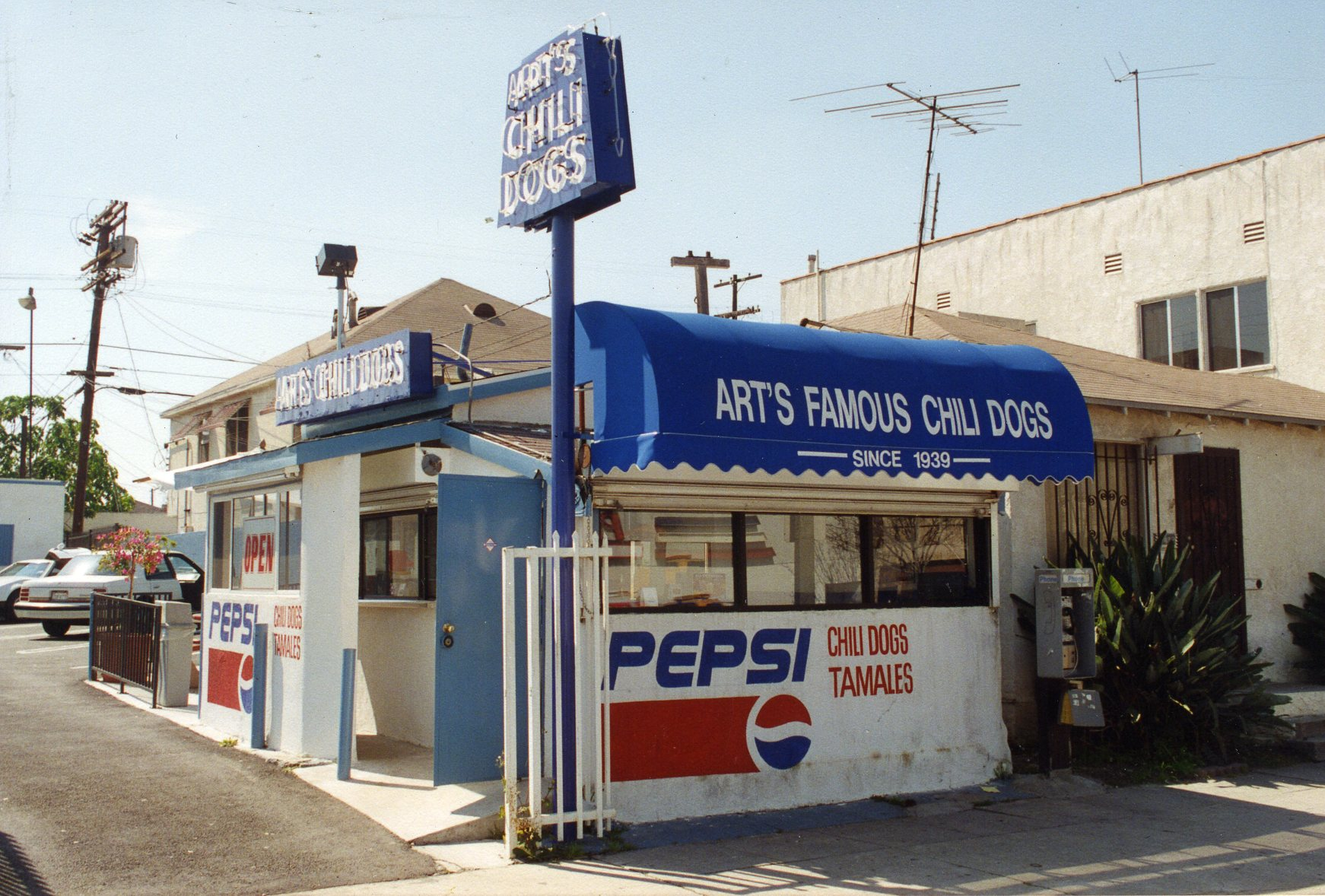
Art's Famous Chili Dog Stand
Los Angeles, CA

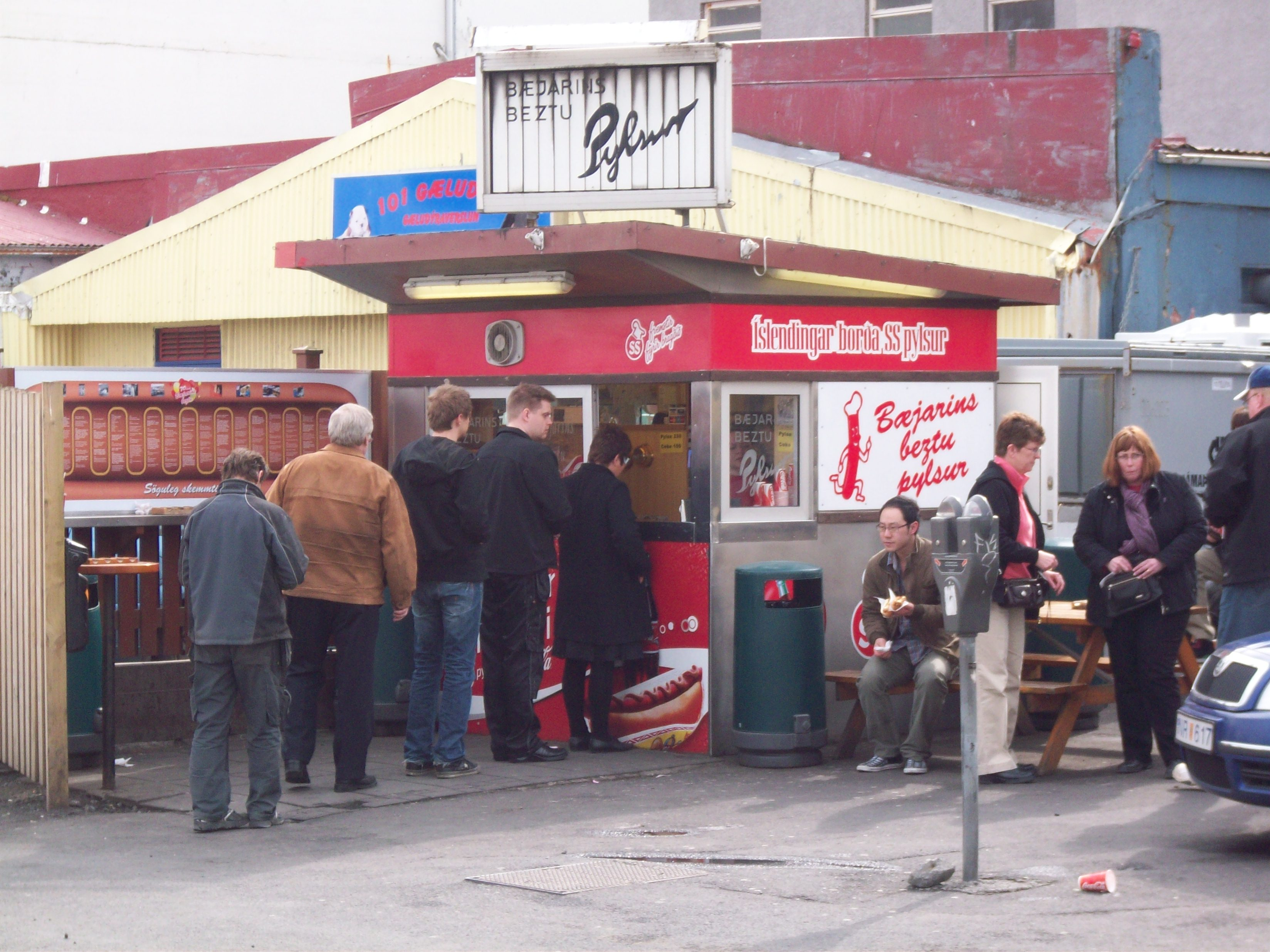
Bæjarins Beztu Pylsur
Reykjavík, Iceland

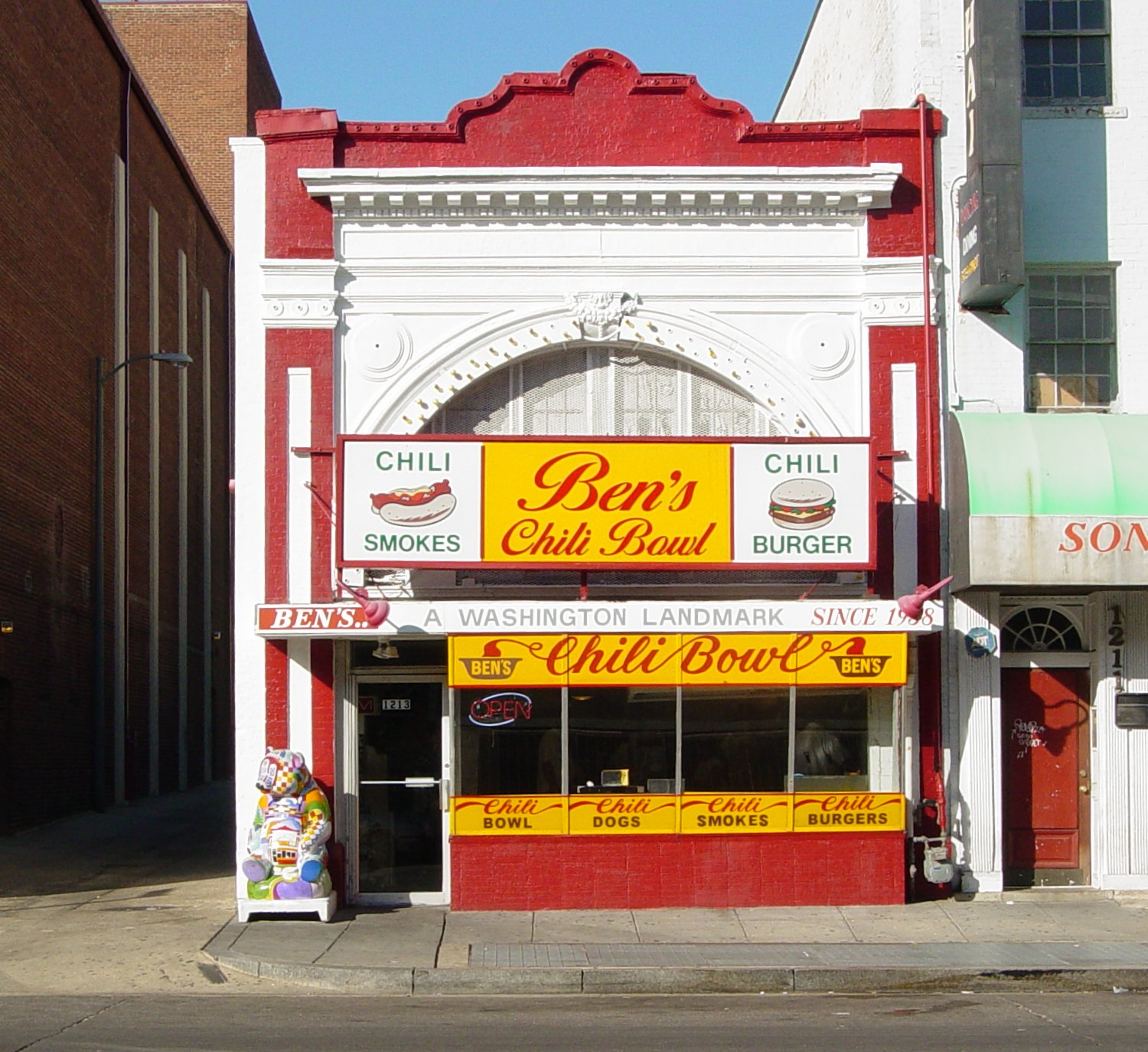
Ben's Chili Bowl
Washington, D.C.

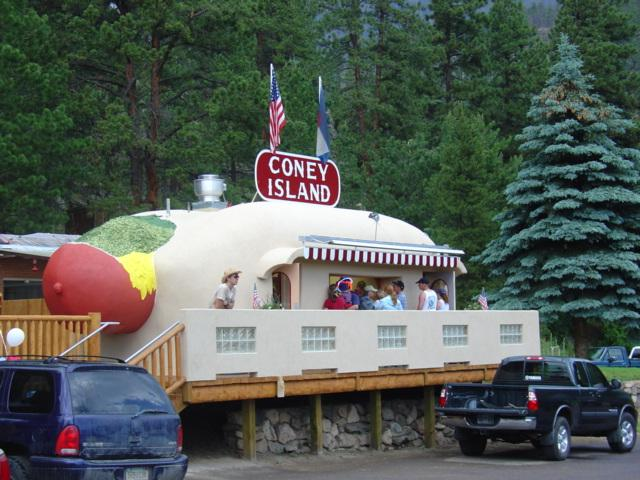
Coney Island Colorado
Bailey, CO

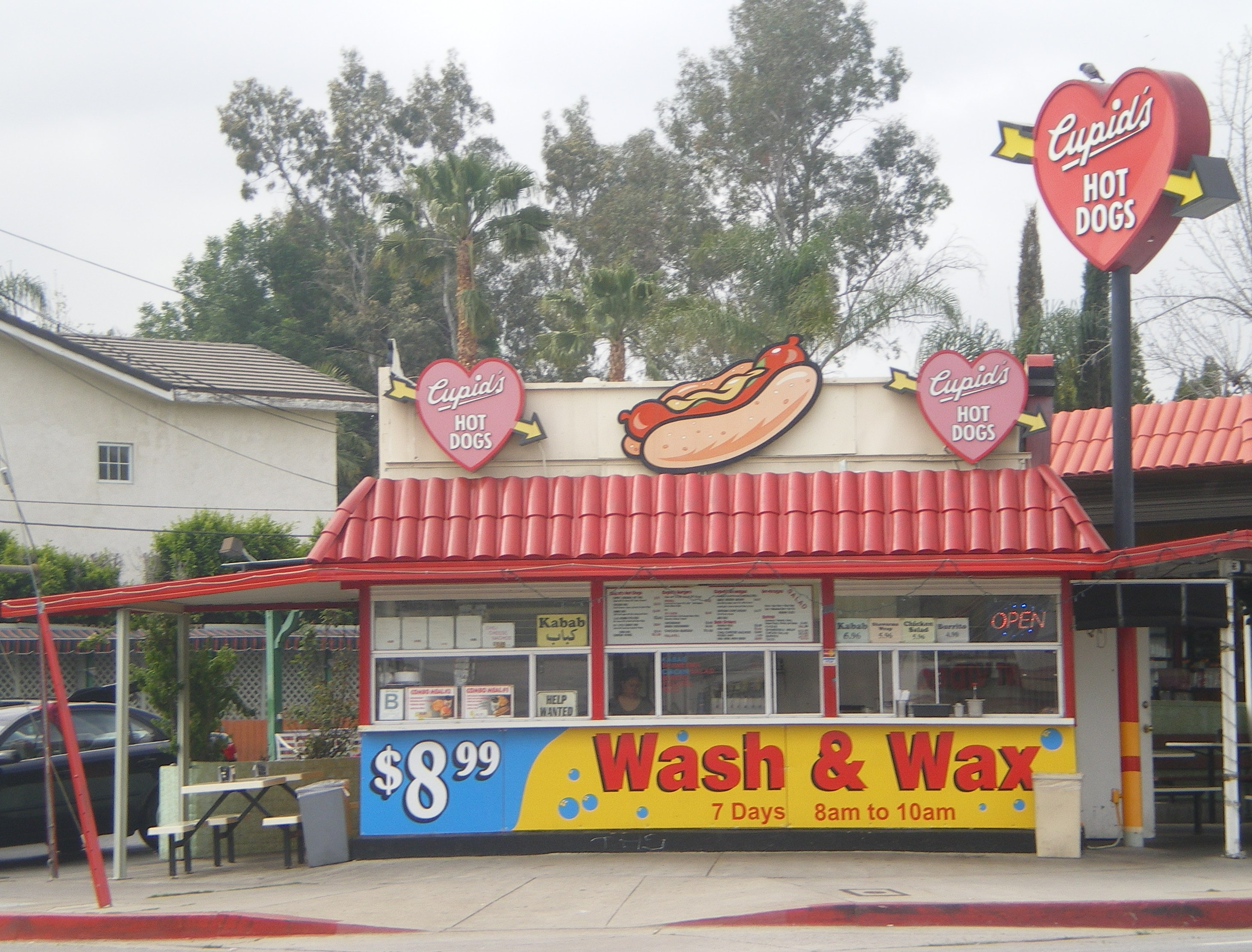
Cupid's
Tarzana, CA

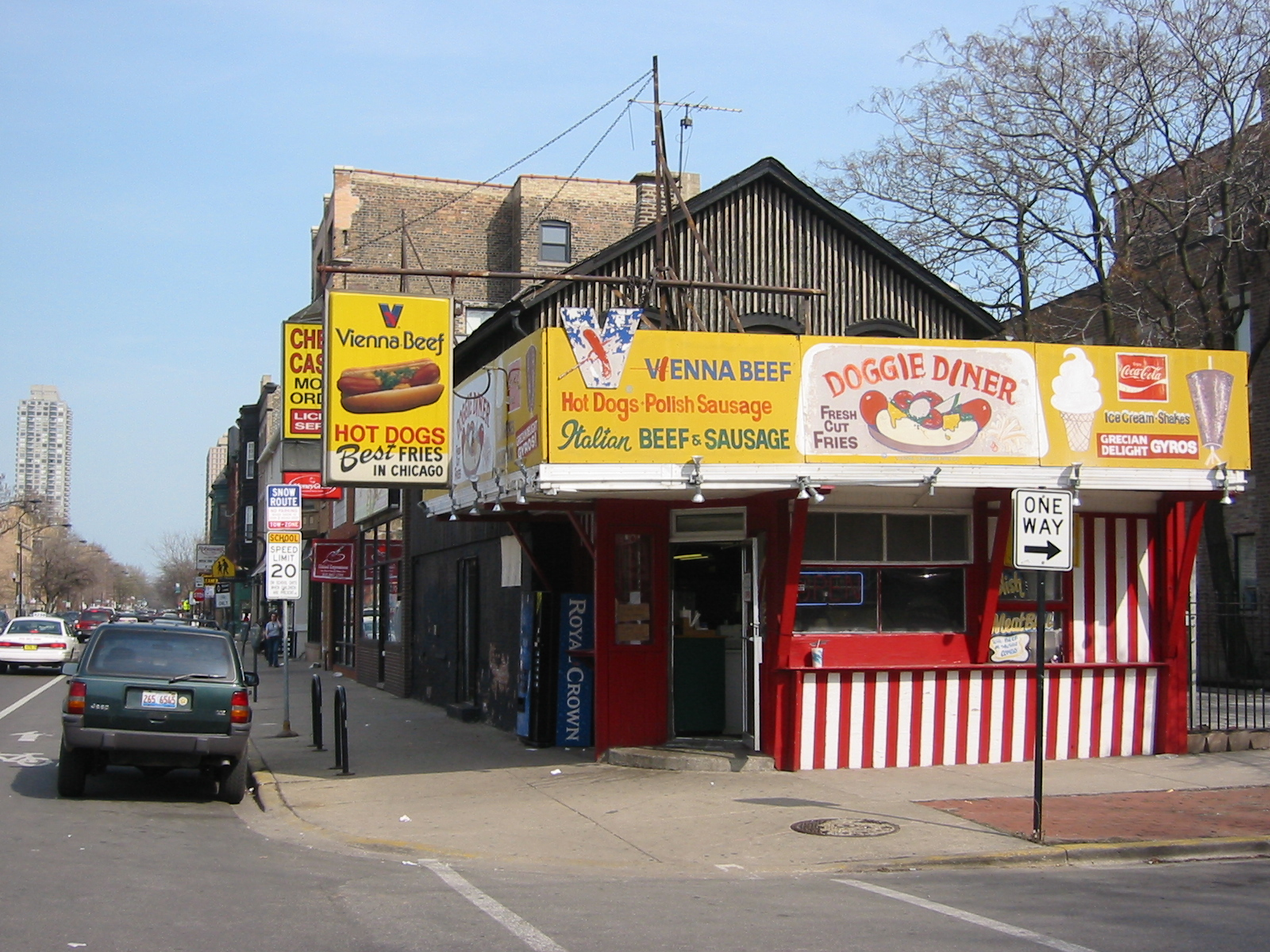
Doggie Diner
Chicago, IL

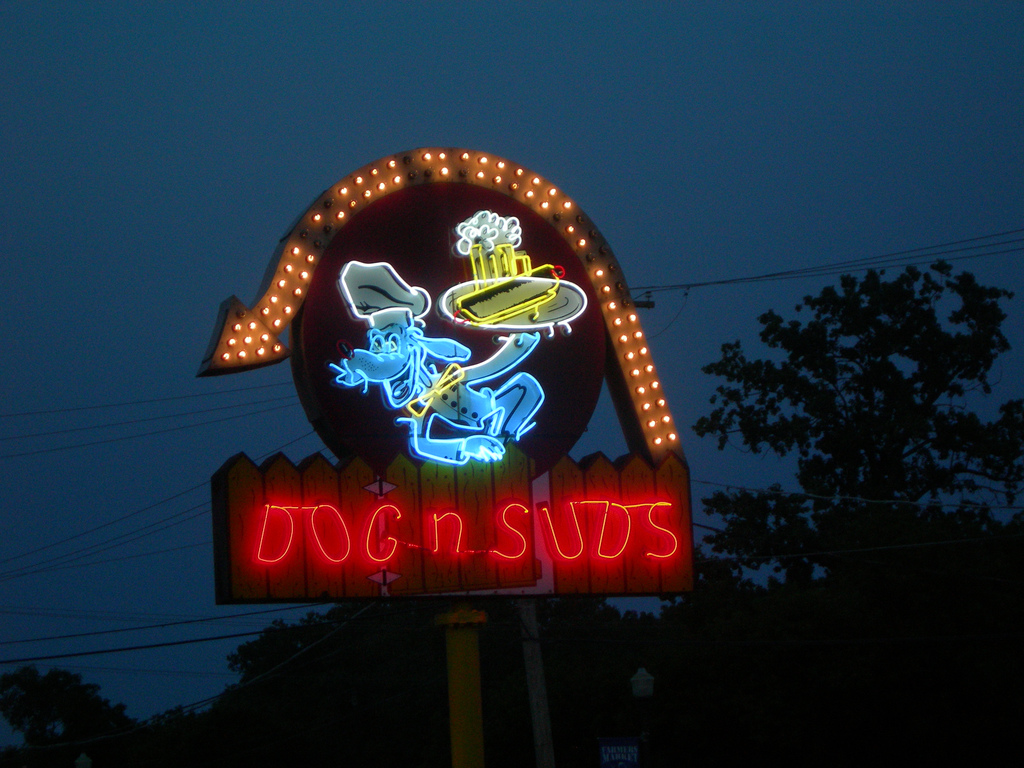
Dog n Suds
Grayslake, IL

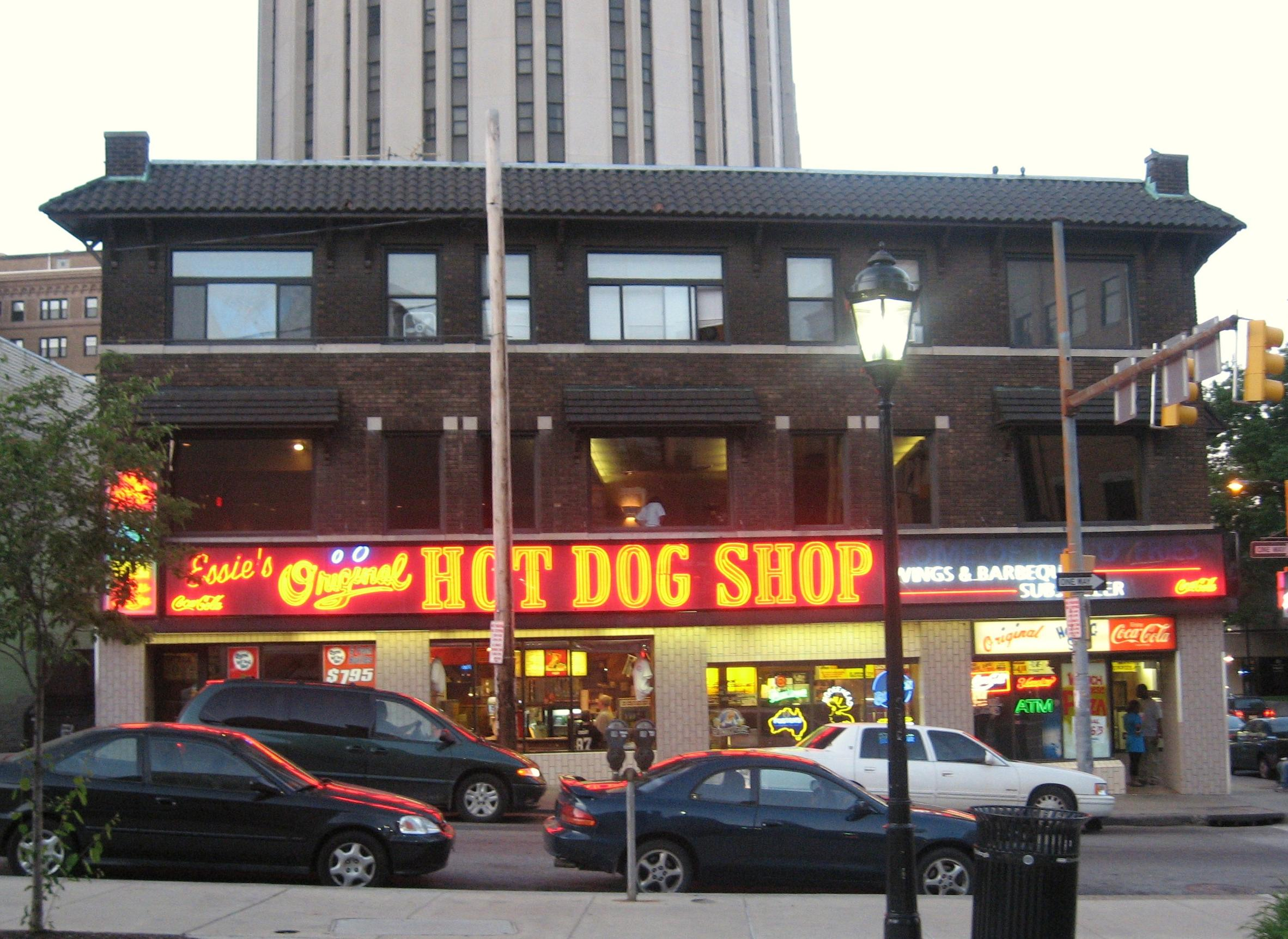
Essie's Original Hot Dog Shop
Pittsburgh, PA

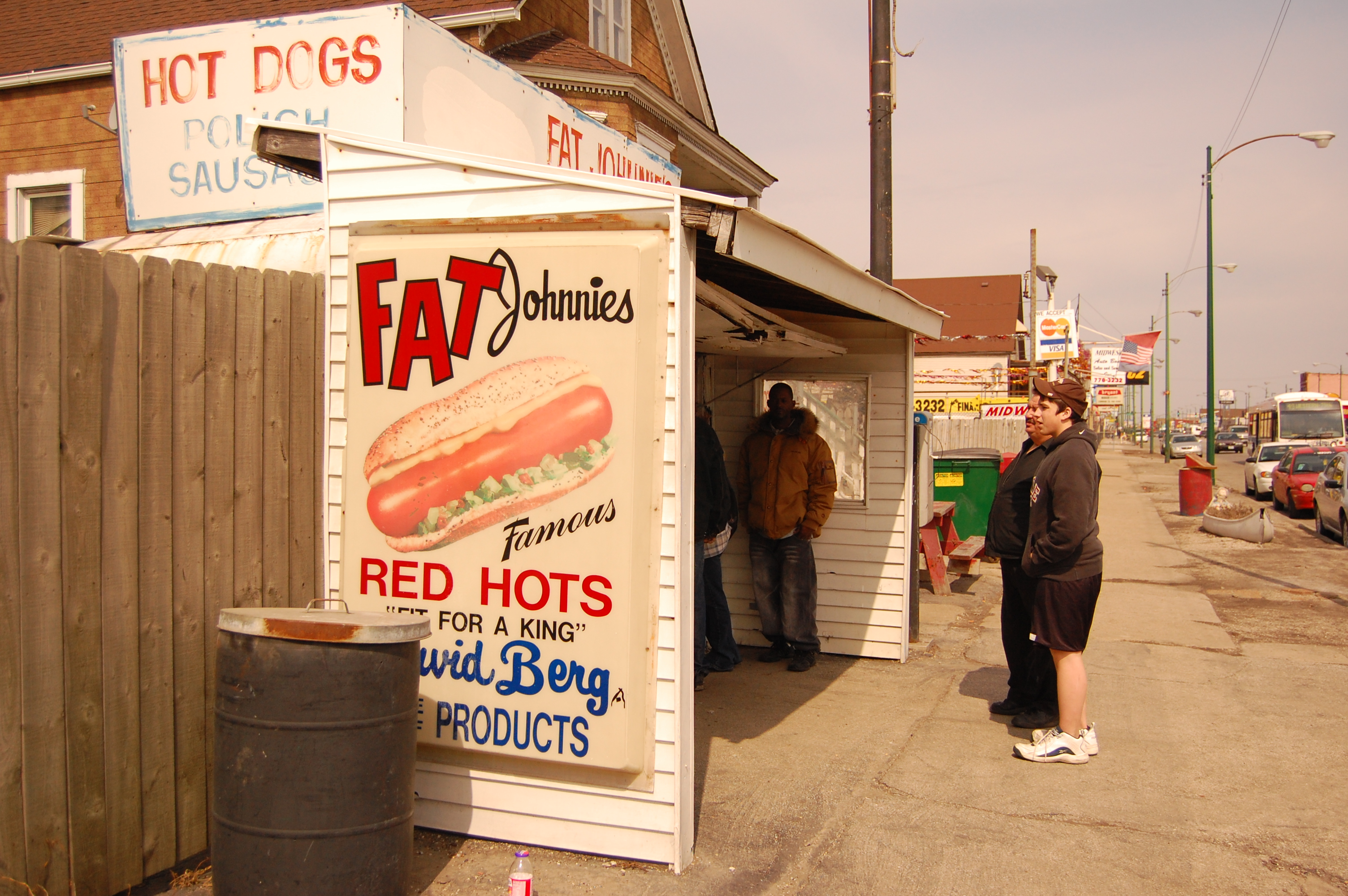
Fat Johnnie's
Chicago, IL

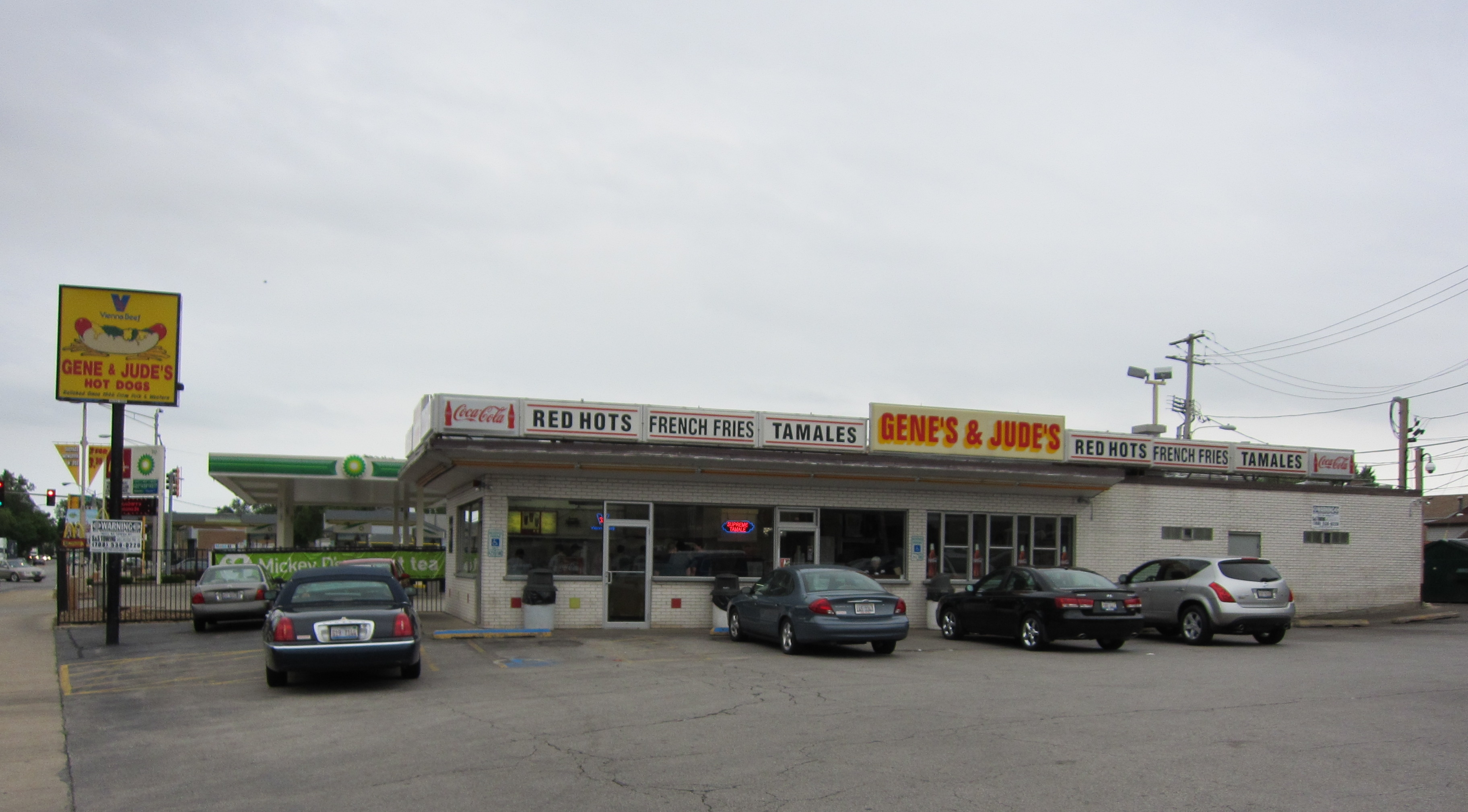
Gene & Jude's
River Grove, IL

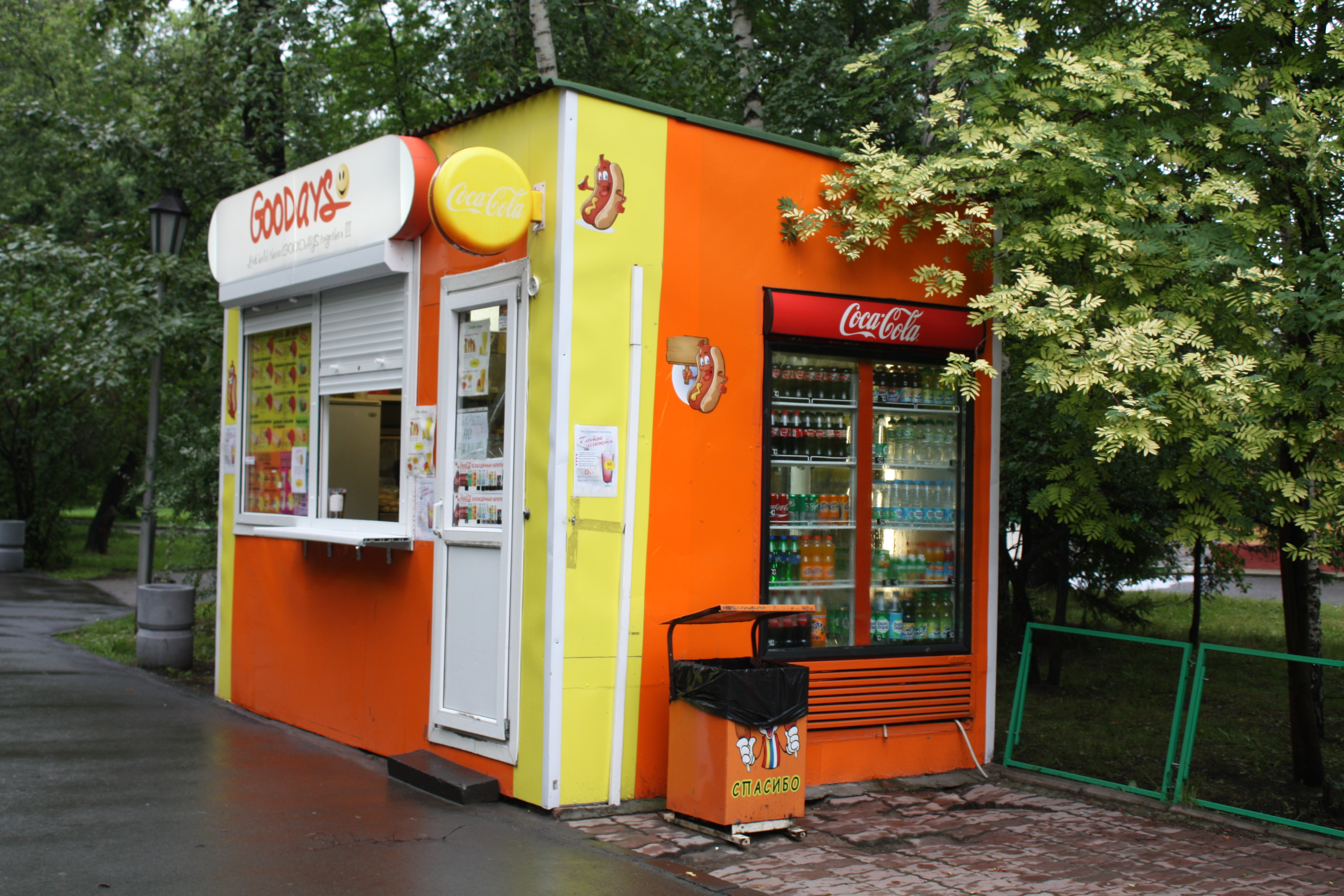
GooDays
Novosibirsk, Russia

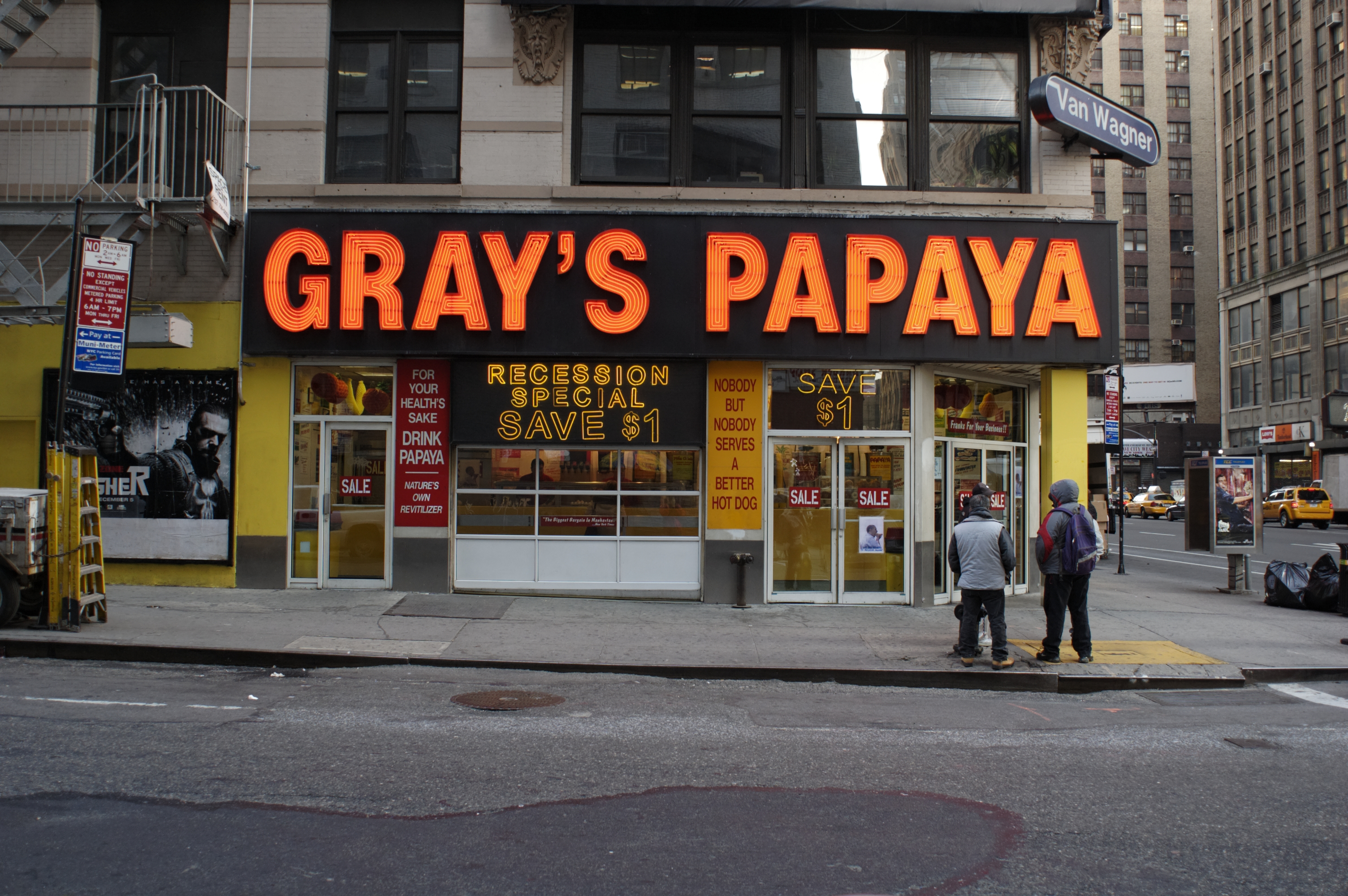
Gray's Papaya
Manhattan, NY

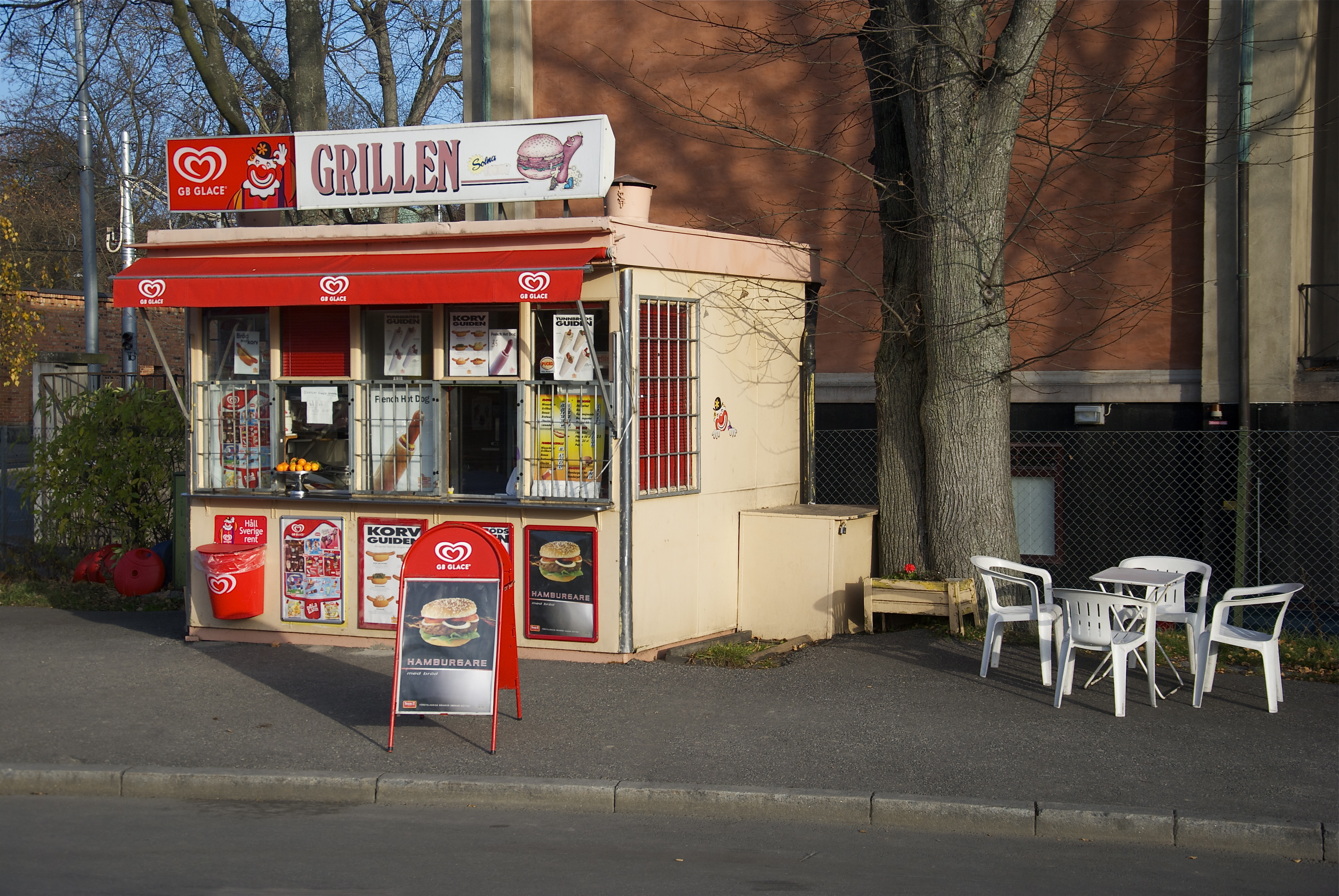
Grillen Solna
Stockholm, Sweden

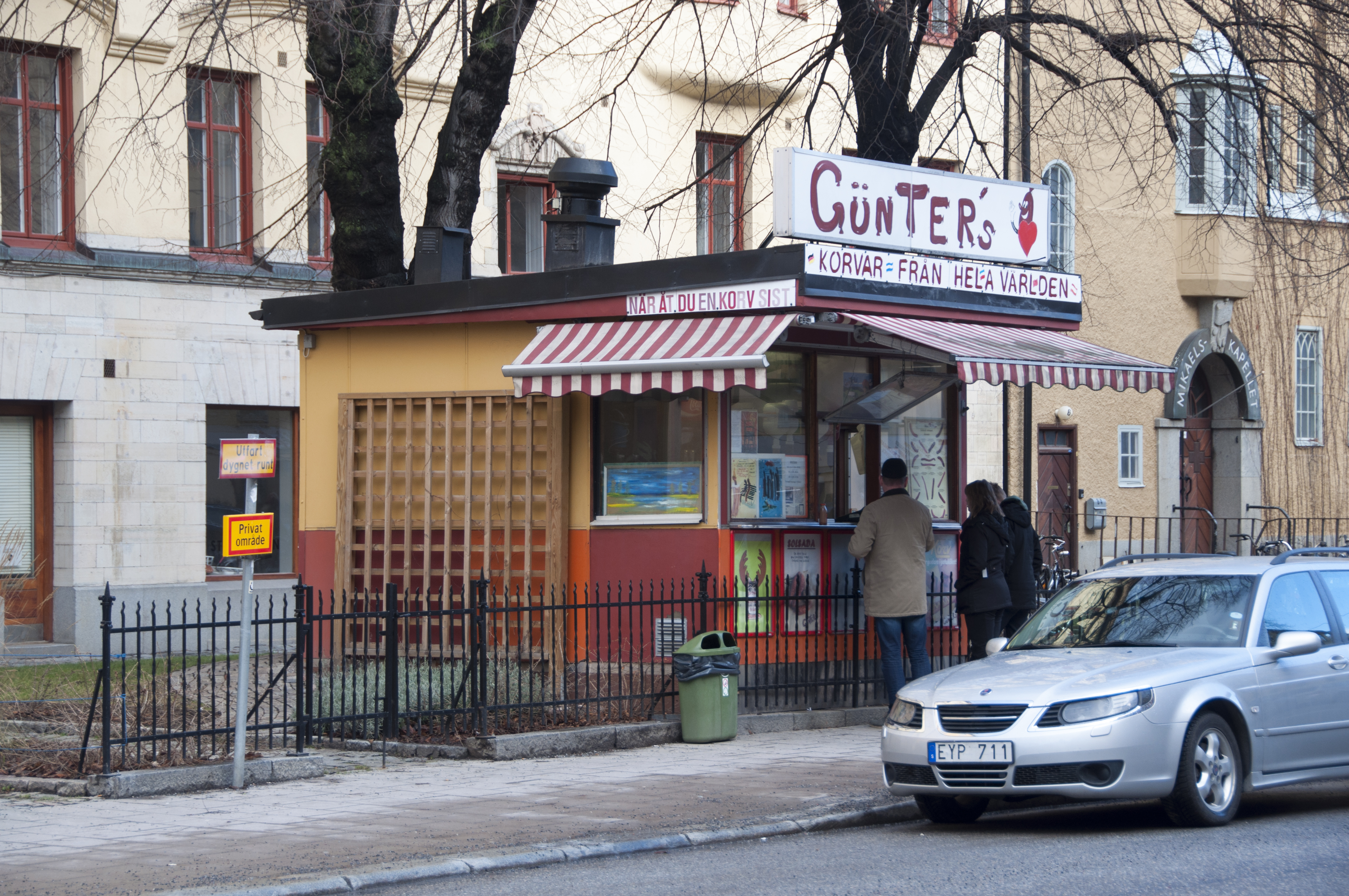
Günter's
Stockholm, Sweden

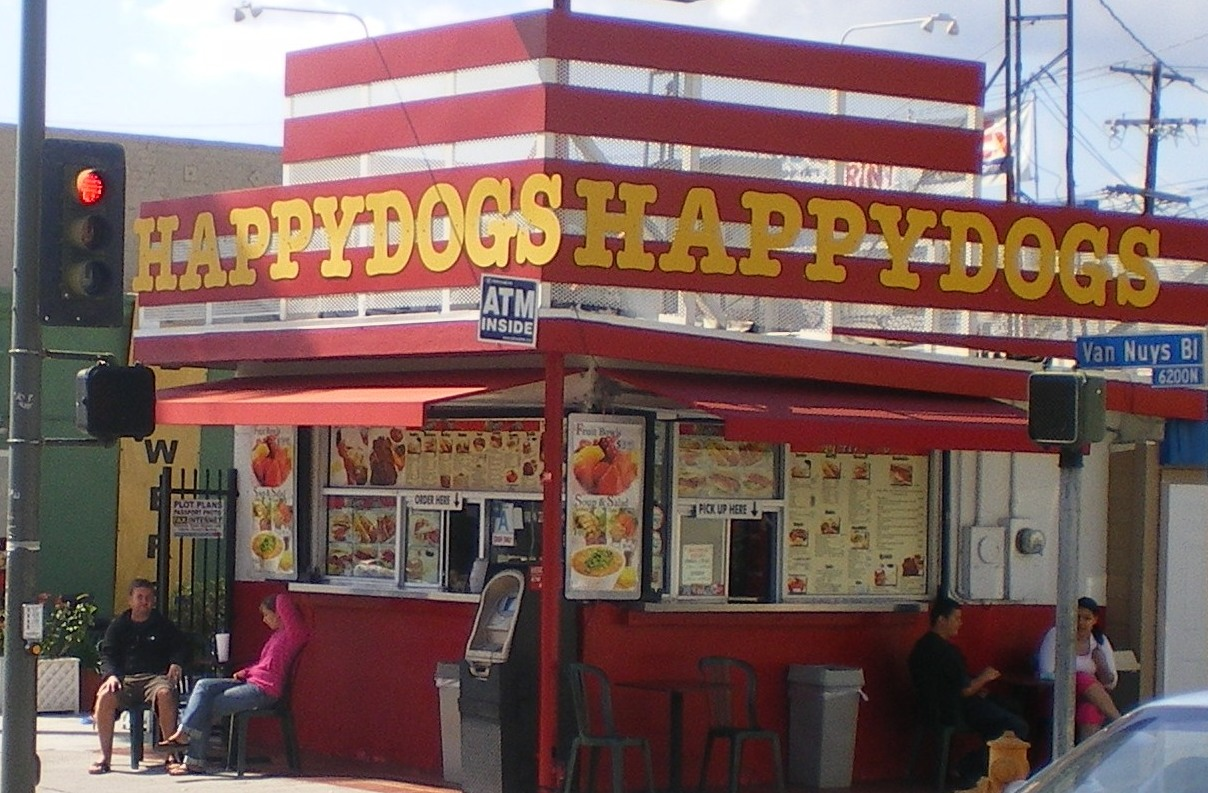
Happy Dogs
Van Nuys, CA

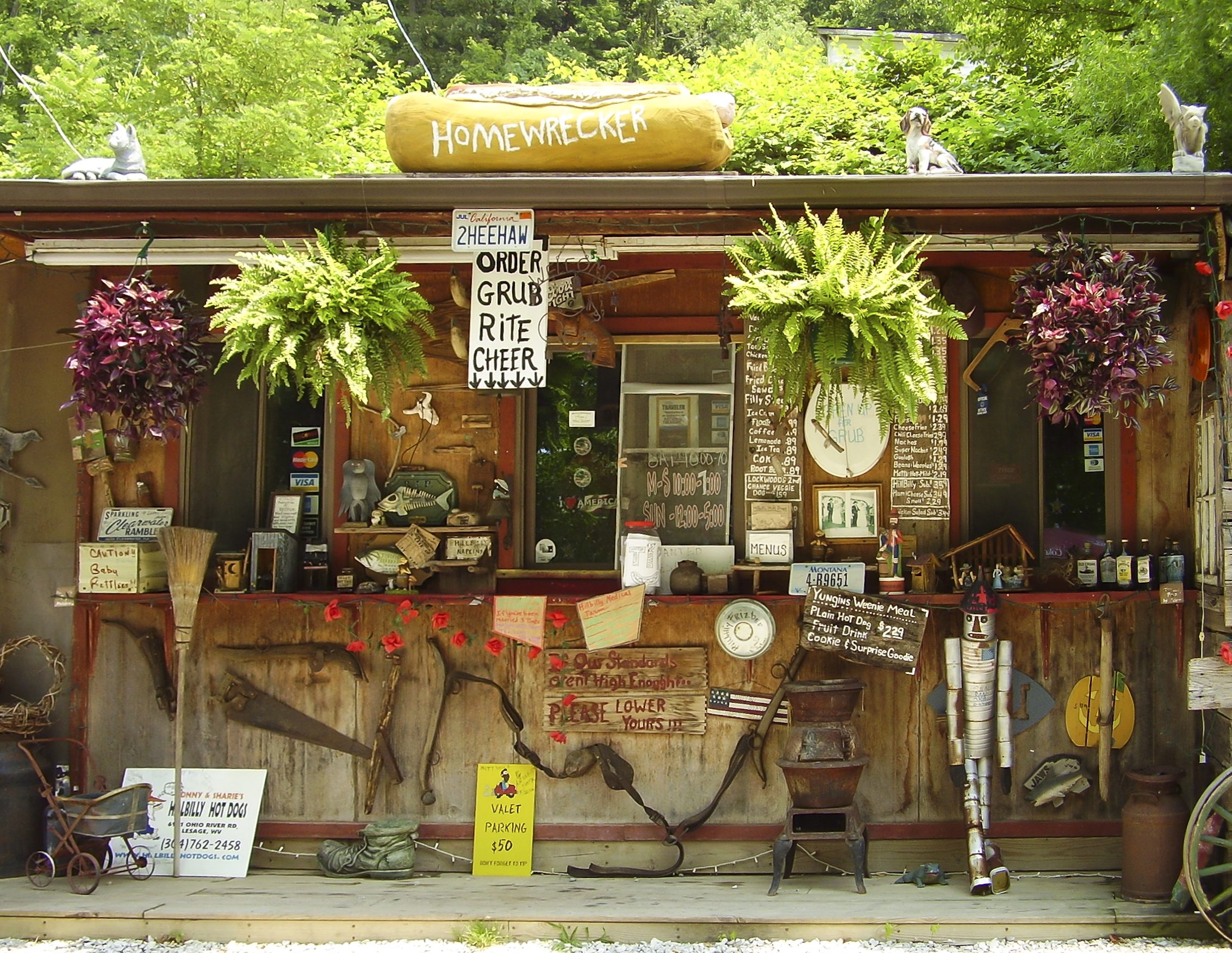
Hillbilly Hot Dogs
Huntington, WV

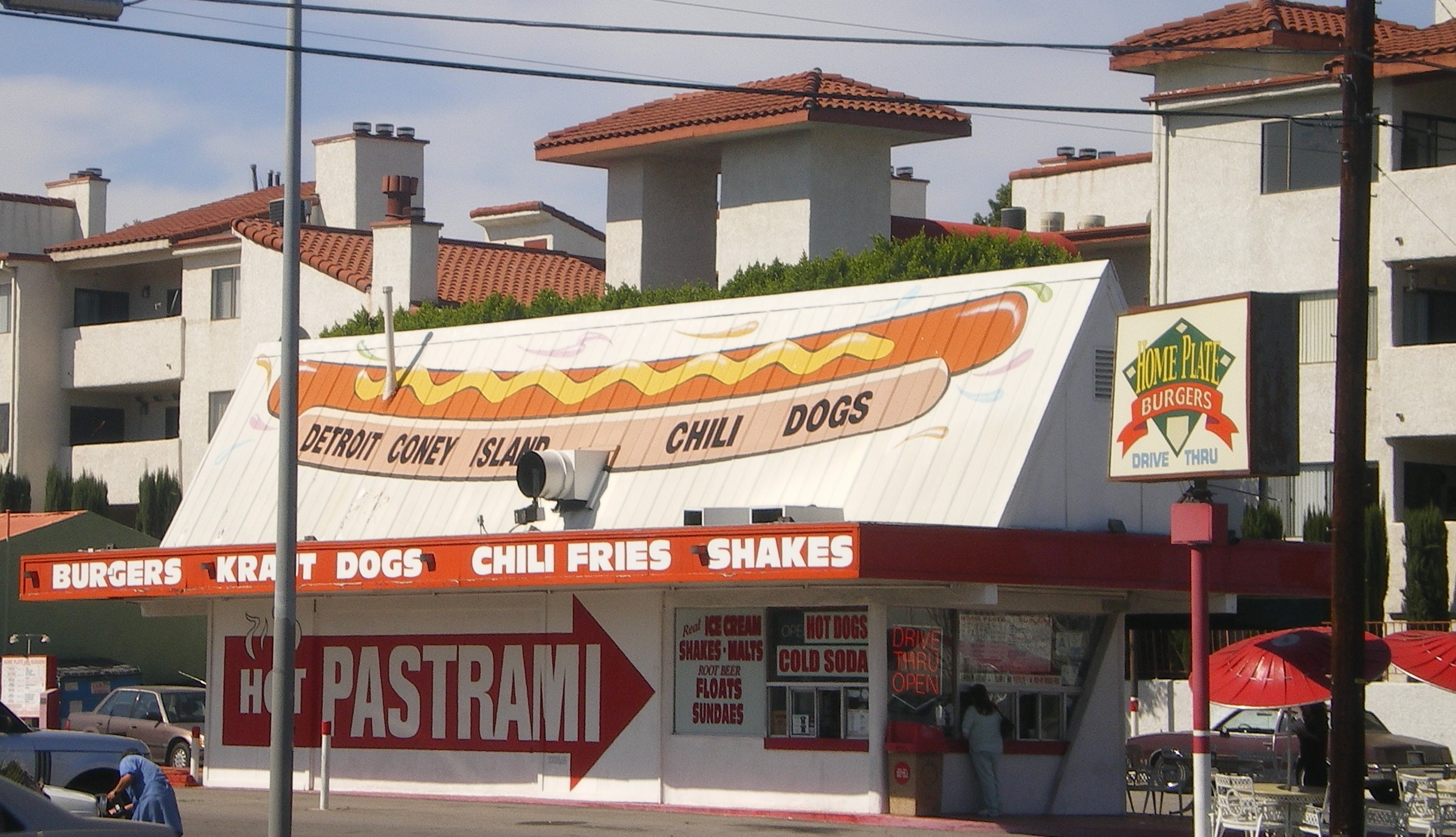
Home Plate
Reseda, CA

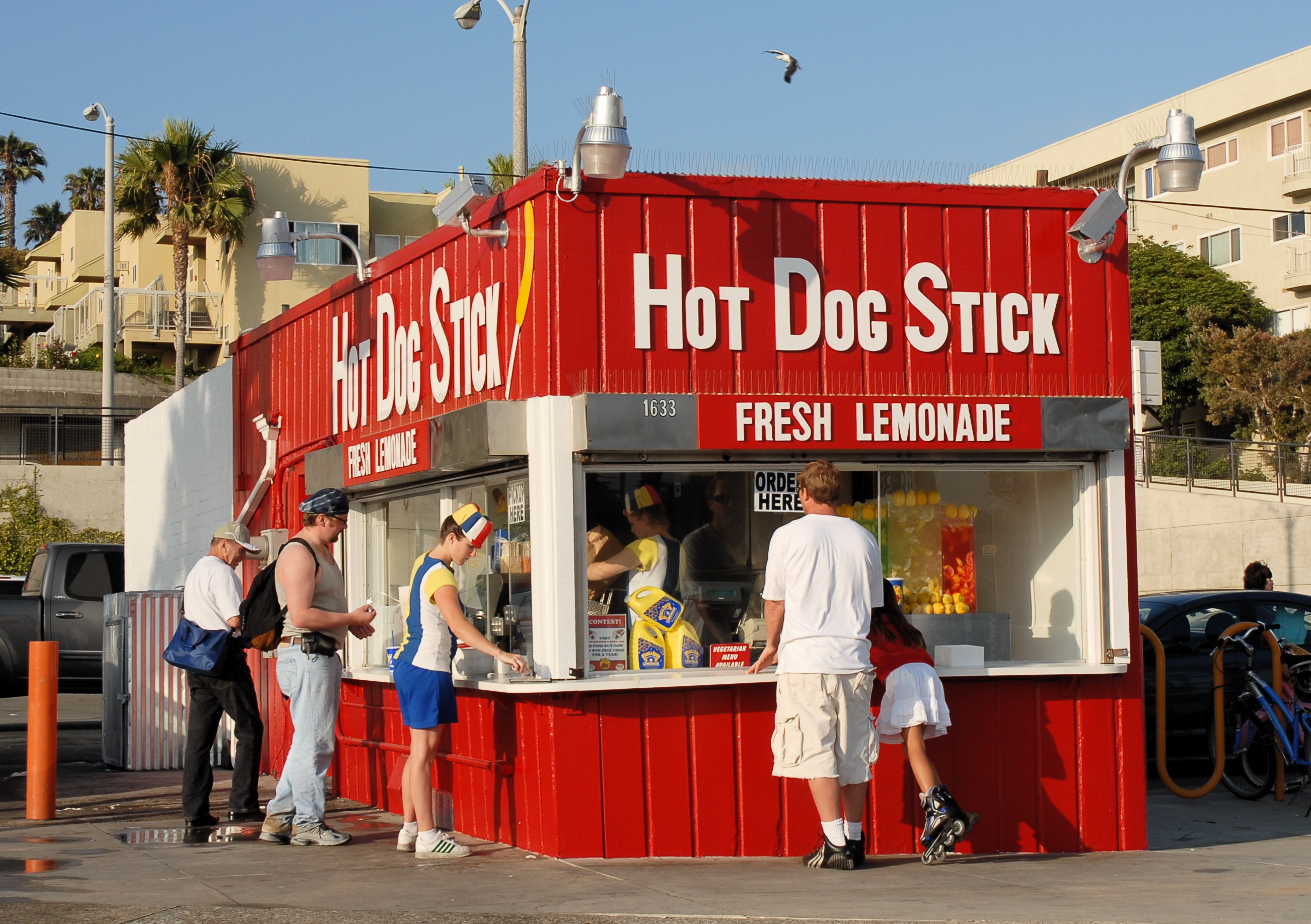
Hot Dog on a Stick
Santa Monica, CA

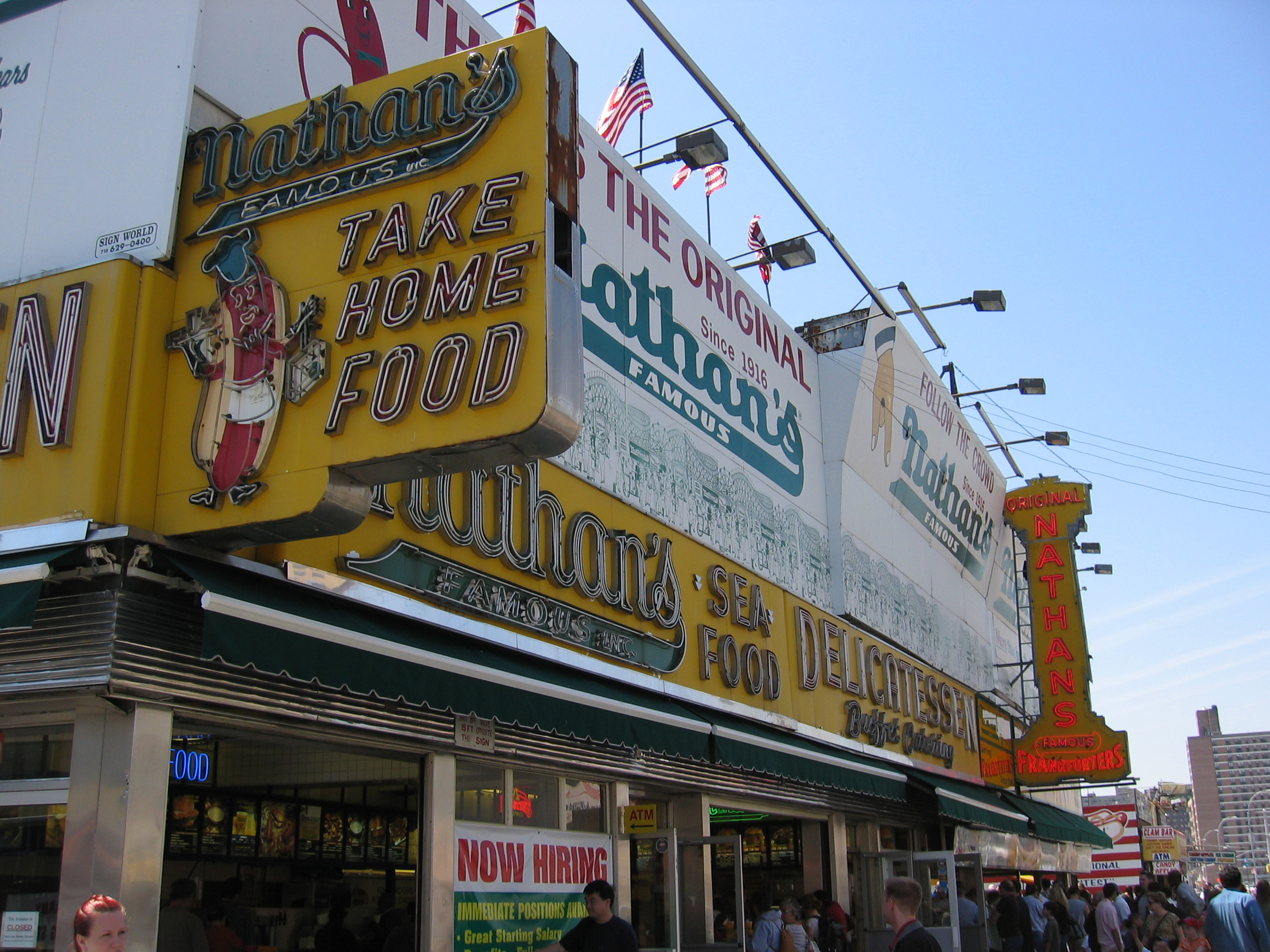
Nathan's Famous
Coney Island, NY

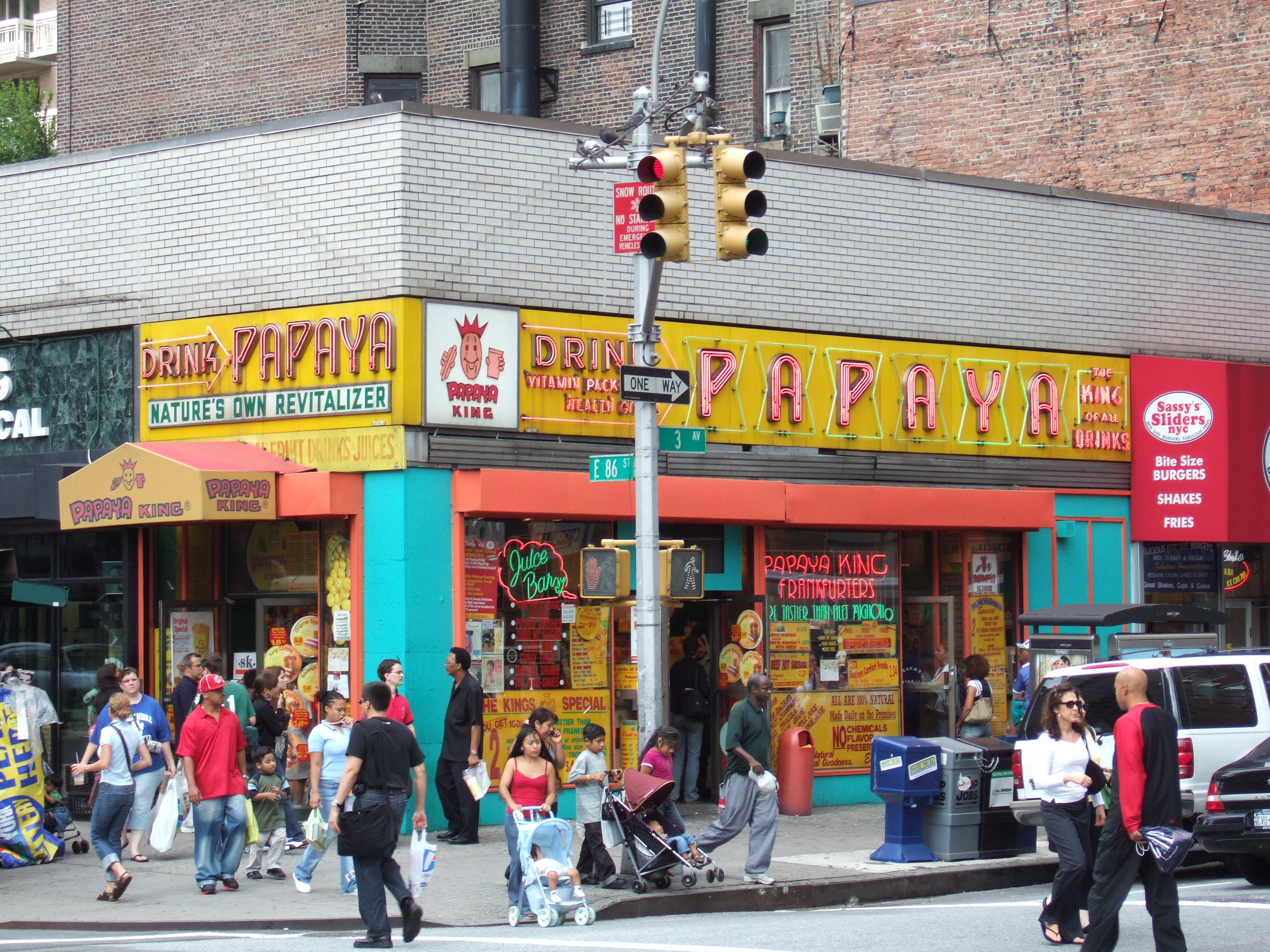
Papaya King
Manhattan, NY

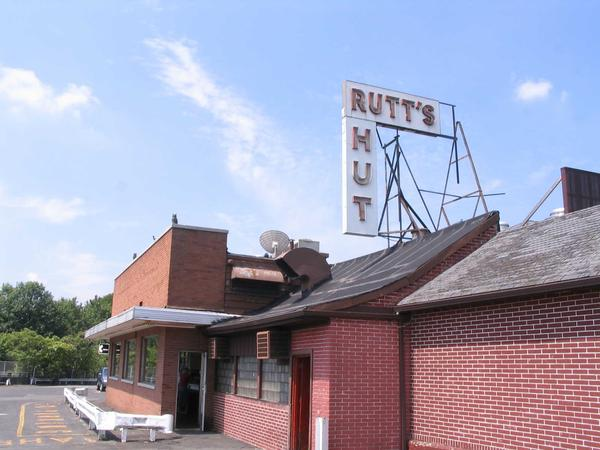
Rutt's Hut
Clifton, NJ

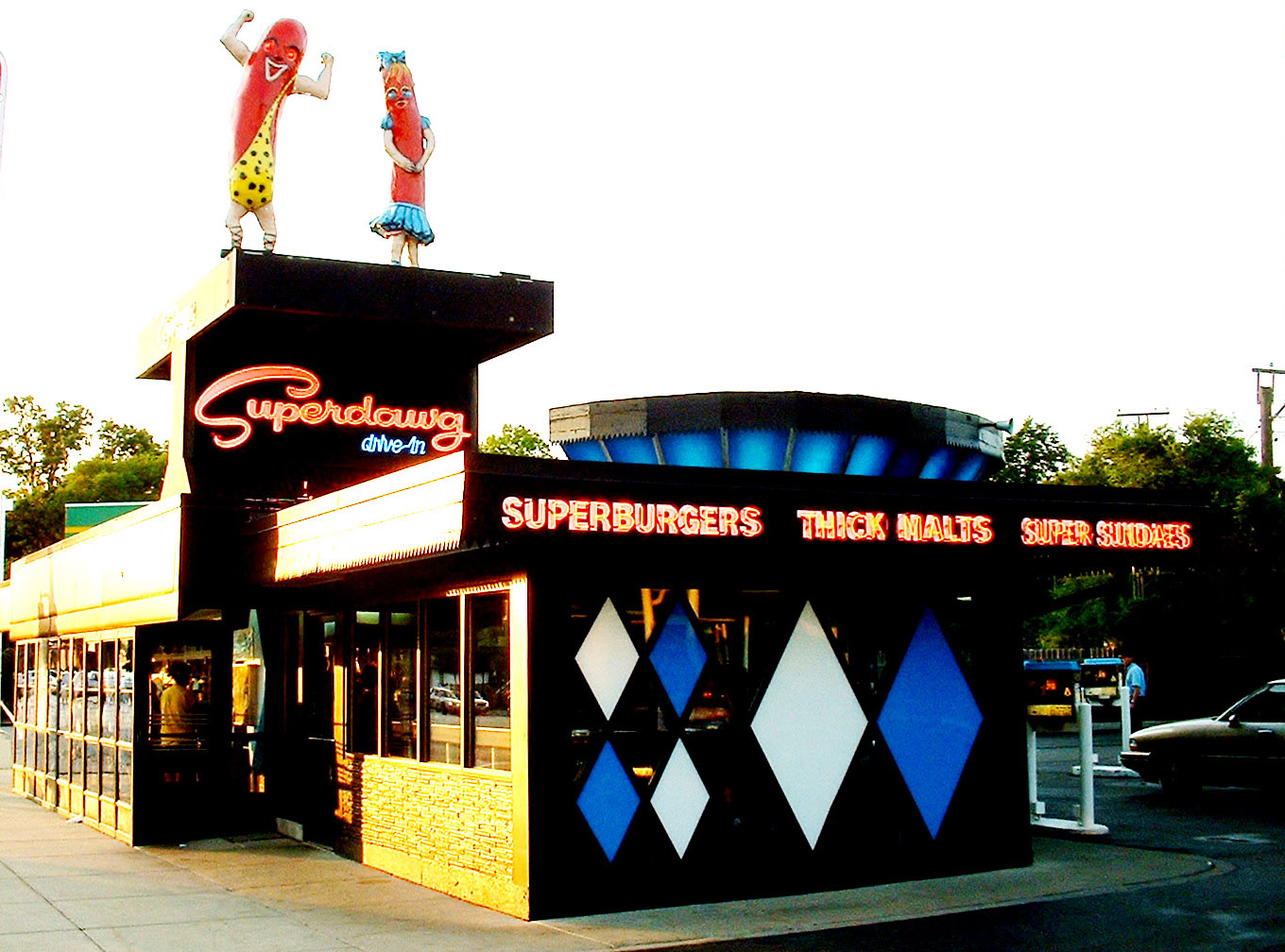
Superdawg
Chicago, IL

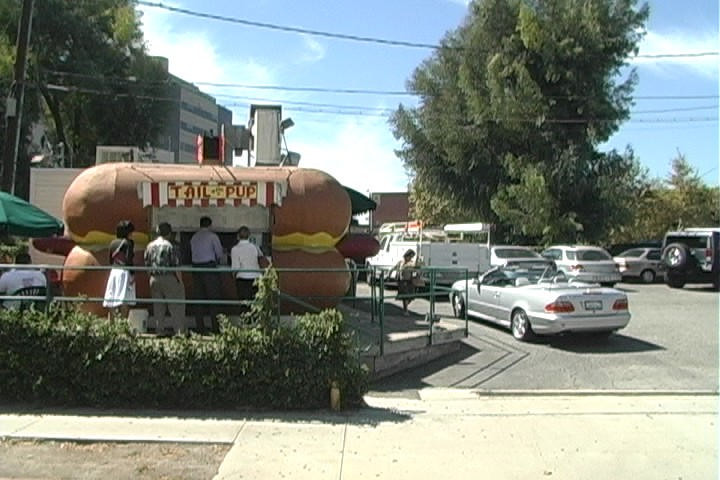
Tail o' the Pup
Los Angeles, CA

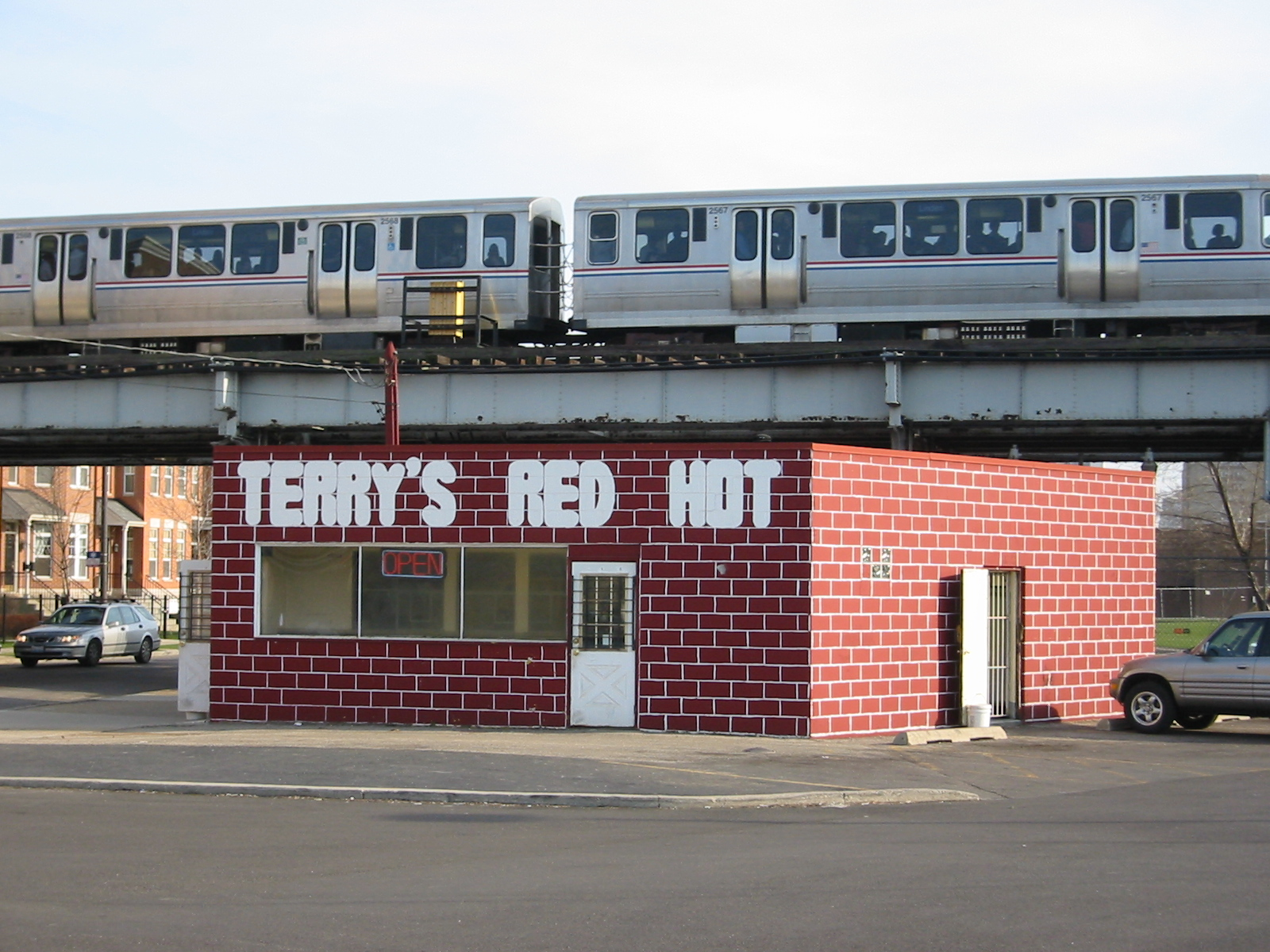
Terry's Red Hot
Chicago, IL

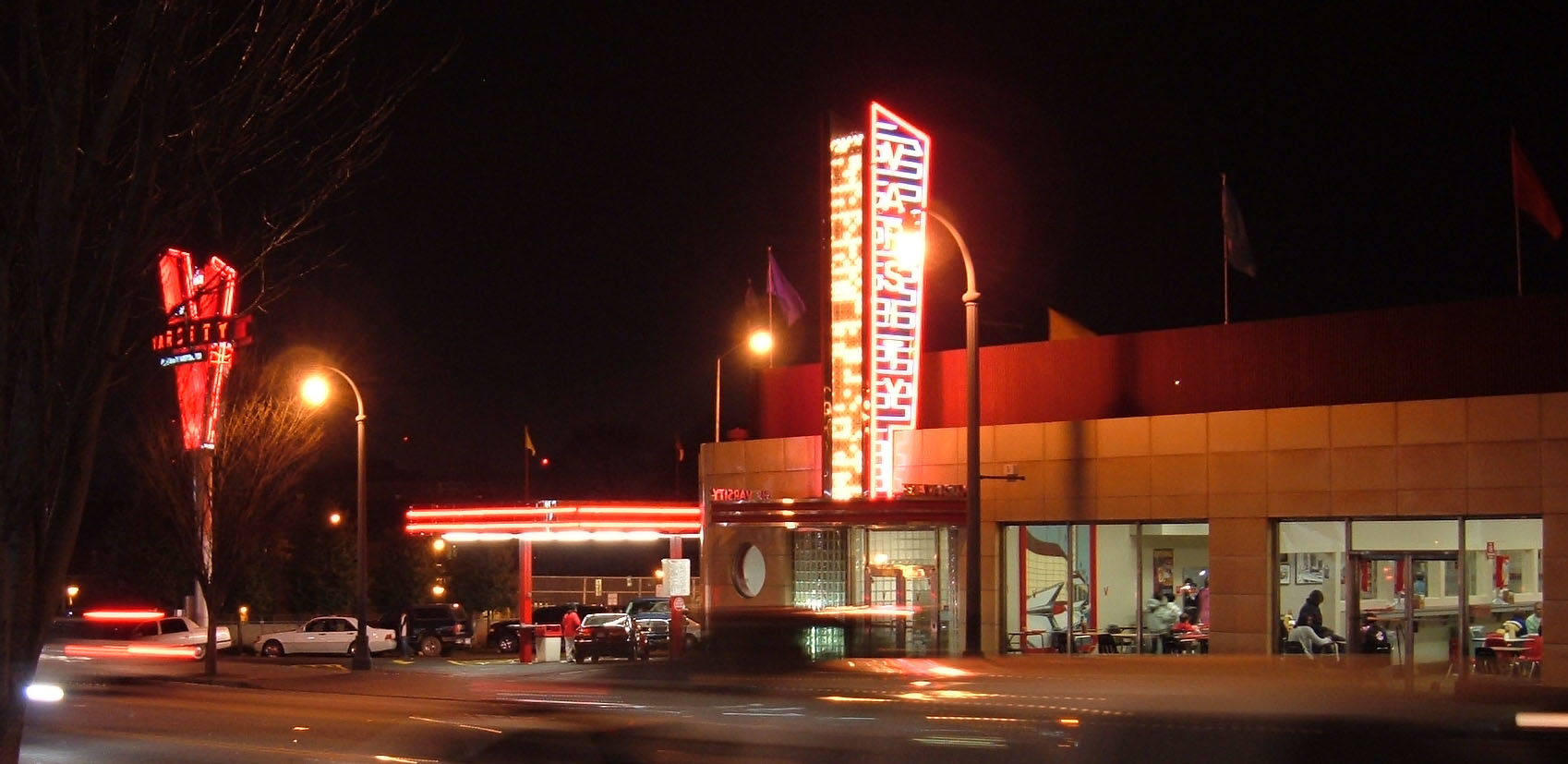
The Varsity
Atlanta, GA

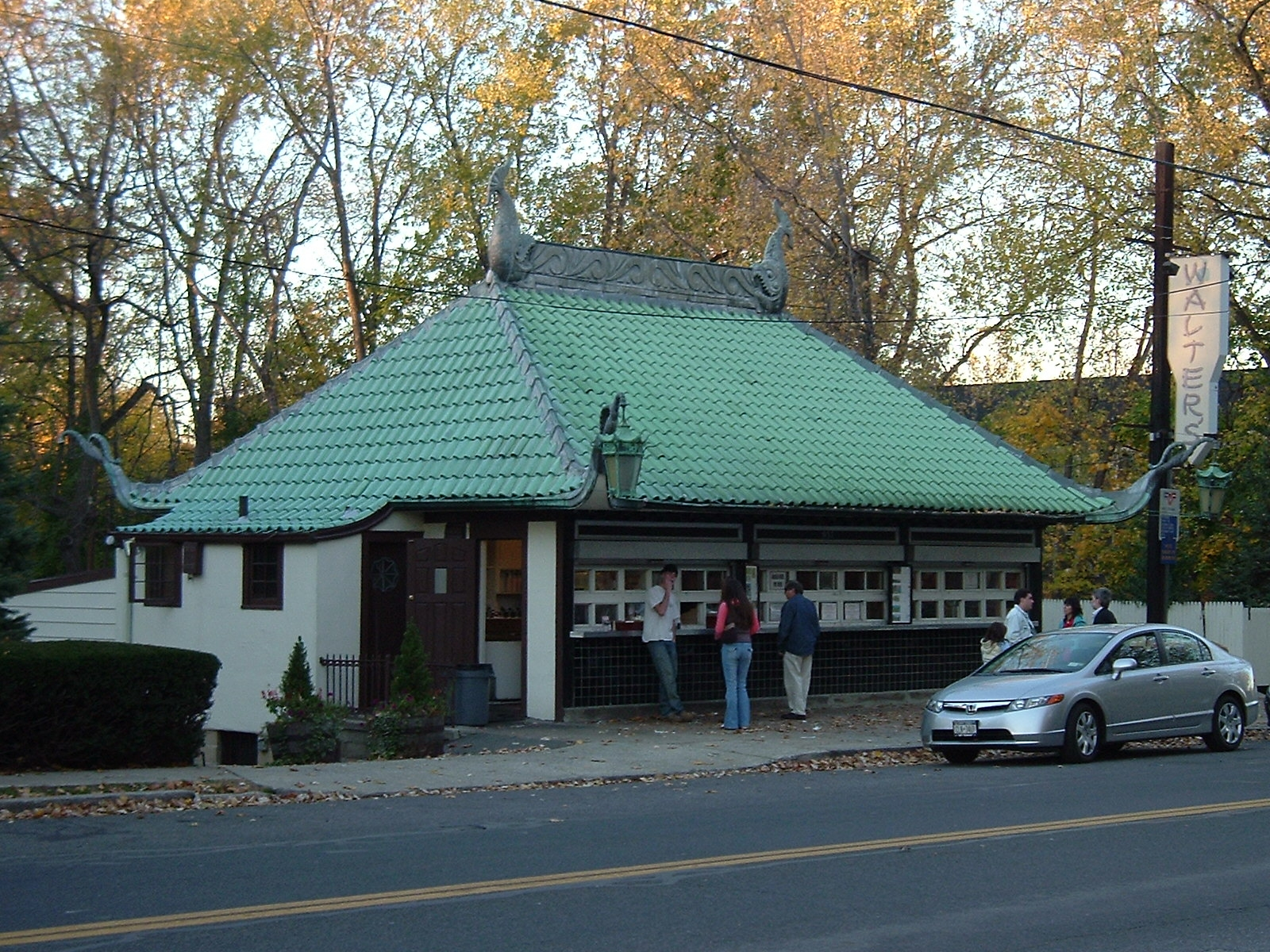
Walter's Hot Dog Stand
Mamaroneck, NY

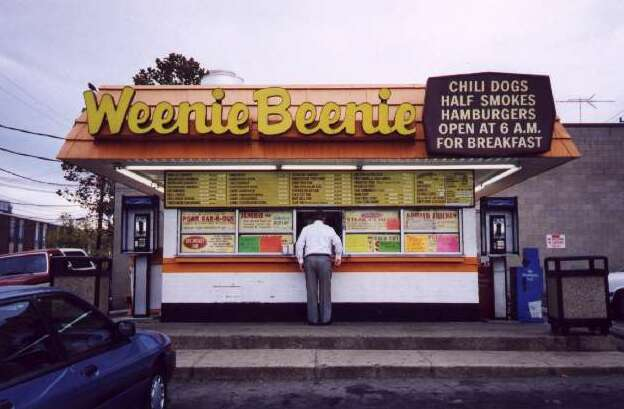
Weenie Beenie
Arlington, VA

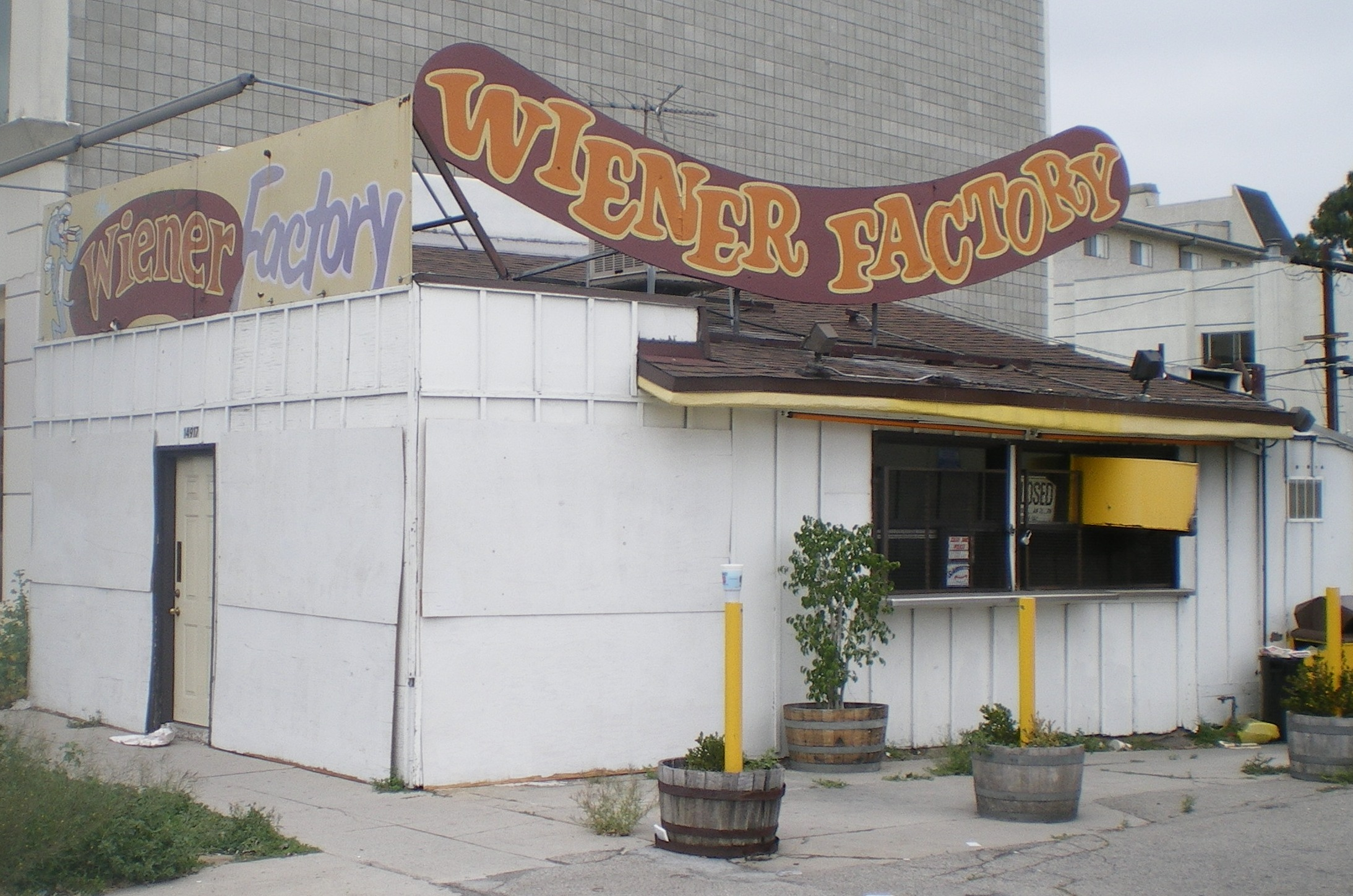
Wiener Factory
Sherman Oaks, CA

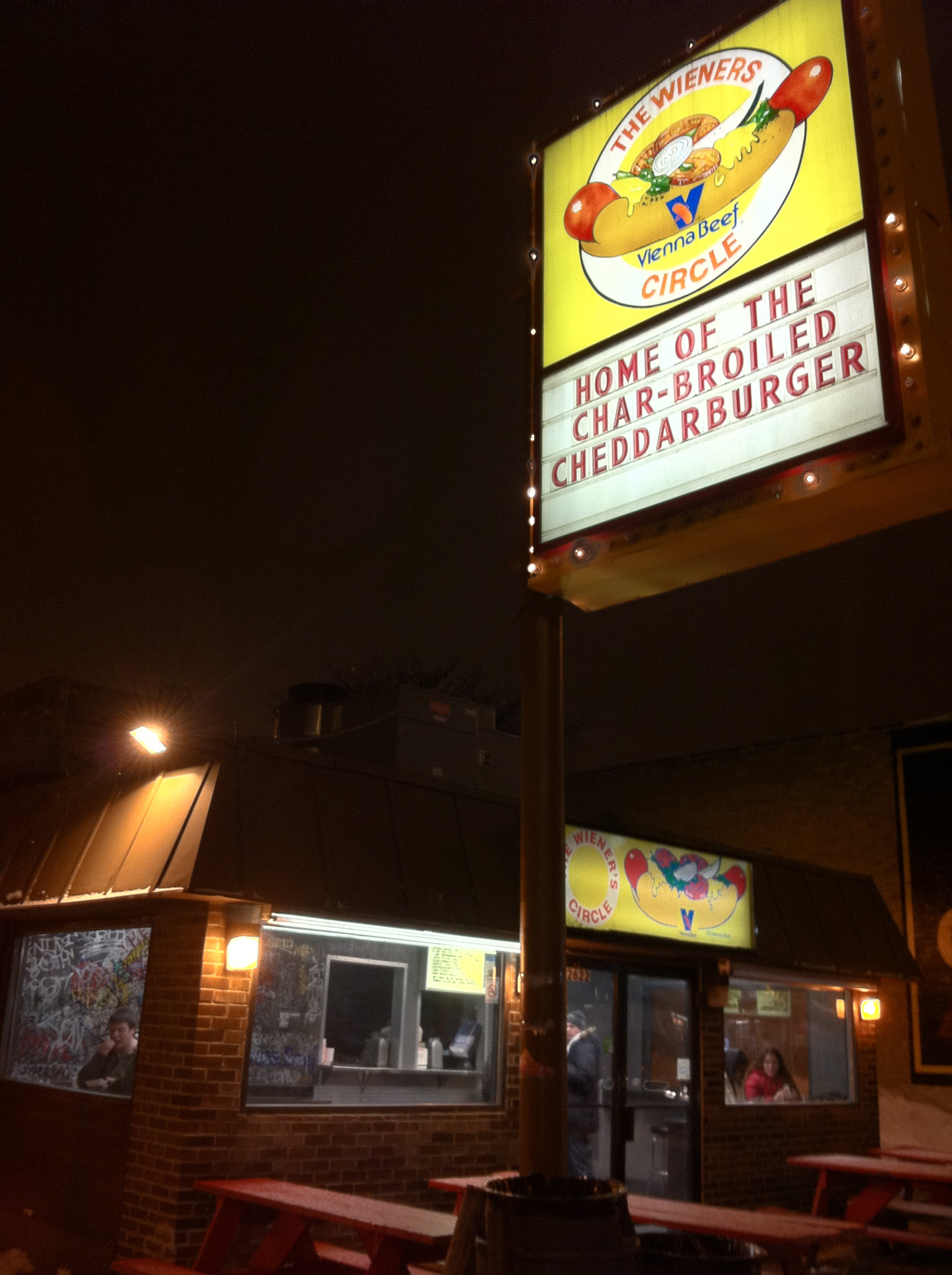
The Wieners Circle
Chicago, IL

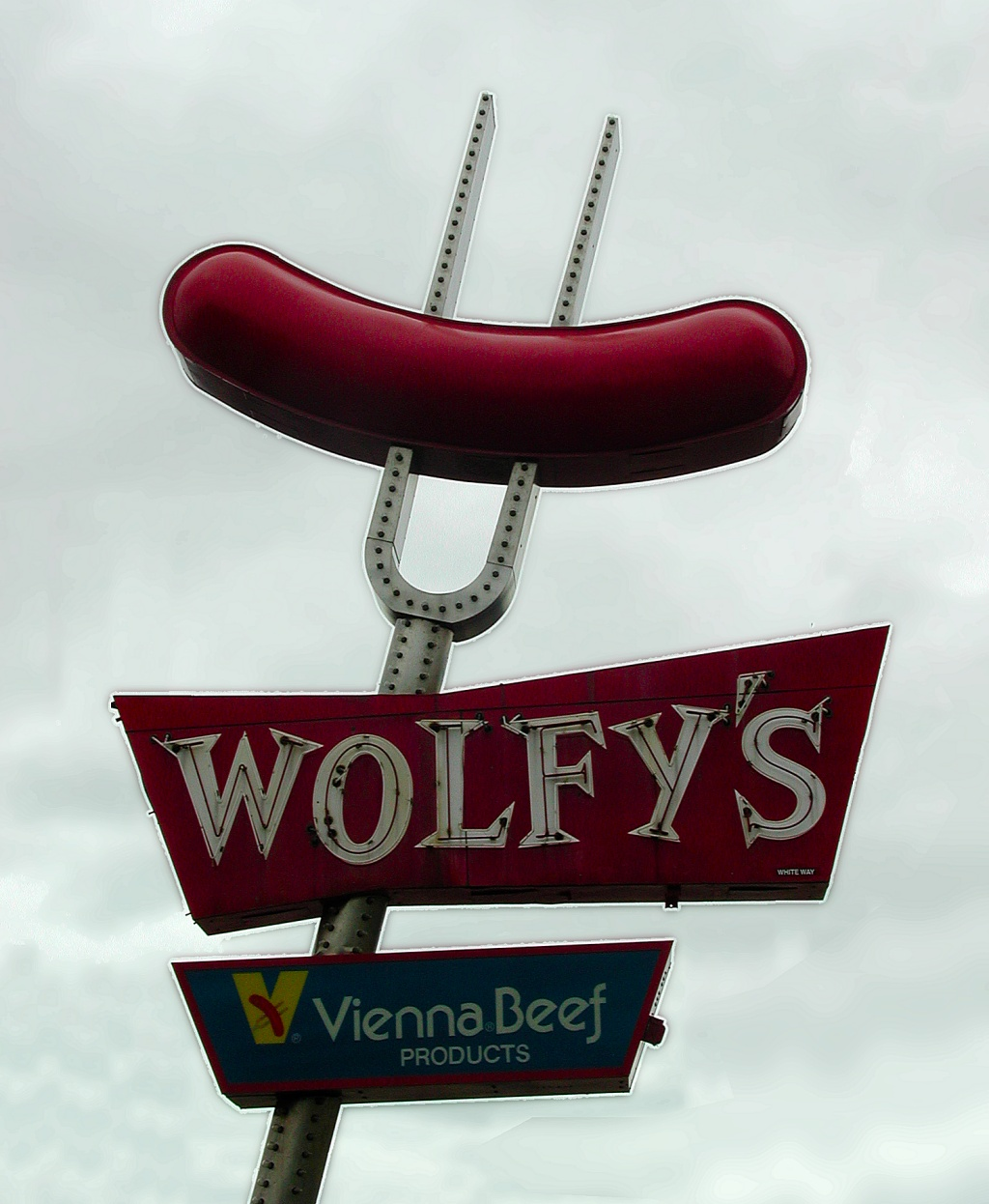
Wolfy's
Chicago, IL

== See also ==
- Hot dog cart
- Hot dog variations
- List of hot dog restaurants
- Taco stand
