= Dan Rossi =

American businessman

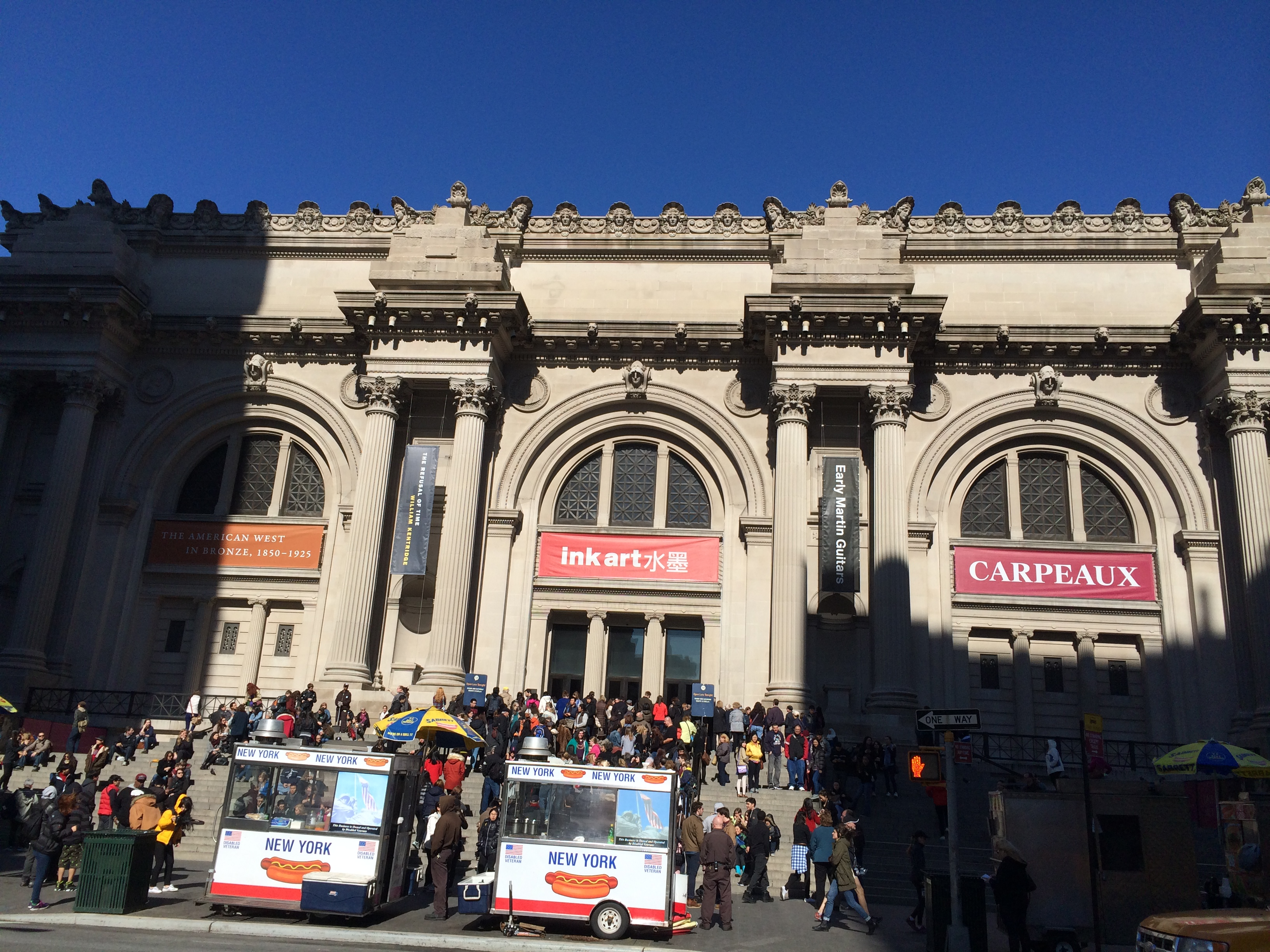
Rossi's hot dog carts outside the Metropolitan Museum of Art building

Dan Rossi is an American hot dog vendor in New York City. From 1985 to 1995, he leased food carts to vendors, at one point owning 16% of all pushcart permits in the city. However, in 1995, a new law passed by the city ended this business. Since 2007, he has sold hot dogs outside of the Metropolitan Museum of Art's main building.

== Early life ==
Rossi grew up in The Bronx. He served in the United States Marine Corps as a machine gunner during the Vietnam War before being honorably discharged due to an injury.

== Career ==
In 1980, Rossi founded Precision Carts Inc, a pushcart-building company in New York City. In 1985 he began directly leasing carts to vendors and, by 1994, owned 499 pushcart permits—16% of all permits in the city. In a profile that year, The New York Times described him as a "one-man hot-dog-cart cartel." Also in 1994, the city began enforcing a law banning street vendors on midtown cross streets. At the time, Rossi was president of the "Big Apple Vendors Association" and acted as a spokesperson for impacted vendors, many of whom protested in the street.

In 1995, a task force created by Mayor Rudy Giuliani recommended making it illegal for individuals to own more than two permits. The mayor's office described the policy as being designed to "open up opportunities for small business entrepreneurs." The policy went into effect that year, essentially ending Rossi's business. Rossi sued the city, arguing that the city was singling out the mobile vendor industry when other industries had similar models to Rossi's business. However, a judge with the New York County branch of the New York Supreme Court upheld the law, and it went into effect later that year. Rossi's permits were redistributed via a lottery.

Rossi first established his stand outside the Metropolitan Museum of Art's main building in 2007. At the time, a private company paid New York City over $500,000 for vending rights, but Rossi argued that a Civil War–era law required the state to provide free vending permits to veterans. Rossi was arrested several times for refusing to pay for a permit but was supported by City Councilman Tony Avella, with the city eventually giving out more permits. Rossi's success led to other veterans following his lead, with the front of the museum eventually becoming crowded with carts. In order to maintain his spot outside the museum, Rossi began sleeping inside his cart overnight. During the COVID-19 pandemic in New York City, Rossi visited his carts outside the museum daily to ensure they were not removed by the city.

In 2022, Rossi appeared in an episode of the Netflix series Street Food: USA. That year, he self-published his memoir The New York Hot Dog King: From Rags to Riches to Less Than Rags. In January 2023, the health permit for Rossi's cart was removed while he slept by city officials. The following month, a second cart owned by Rossi was ordered to move locations. Rossi alleged that he was being targeted by the city and his family launched a petition on Change.org demanding the city enforce the health code more fairly. The petition received over 50,000 signatures.

== Personal life ==
Rossi is married and has four daughters. His daughter Elizabeth is also a disabled veteran and operates the hot dog stand next to his outside the Metropolitan Museum.
