= Art's Famous Chili Dog Stand =

Hot dog stand in Los Angeles, California, U.S.

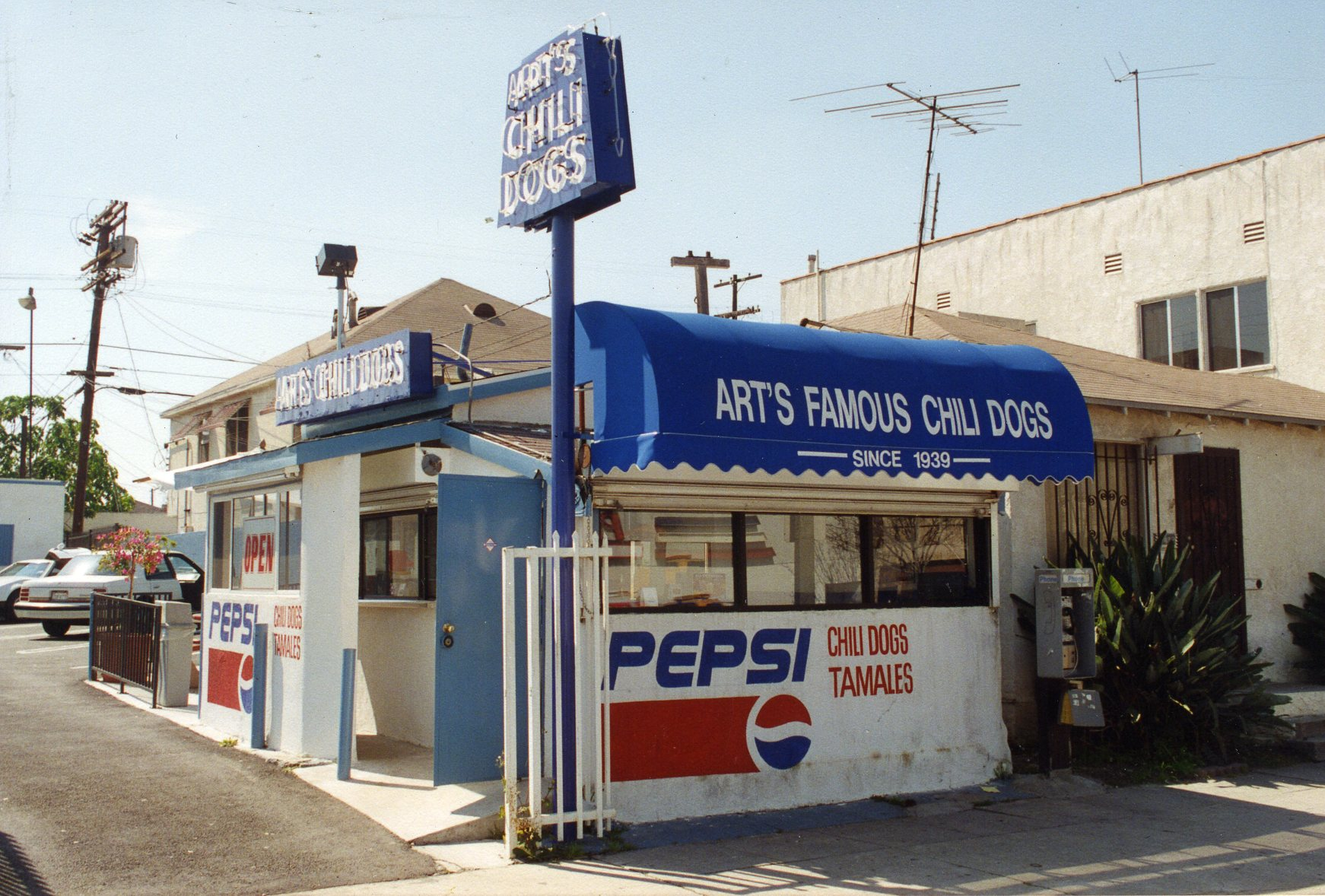
- Interactive map of Art's Famous Chili Dog Stand

Restaurant information
- Established: 1939
- Food type: Chili Dogs, Hot Dogs
- Dress code: Casual
- Location: 1410 W Florence Ave, Los Angeles, California, 90047, United States
- Coordinates: 33°58′27.7932″N 118°18′3.0456″W

Art's Famous Chili Dogs was a hot dog stand located in Los Angeles, California. It was founded in 1939 by Art Elkind, a frankfurter entrepreneur, who was its owner until 1990. It was well known for its chili dogs, which have been praised by a variety of Los Angeleno media outlets, and proclaimed by aficionados as the finest in the city.

== History ==
Art Elkind, a chemical engineer, turned to selling hot dogs when unable to find work during the Great Depression. Art's Famous Chili Dogs opened in 1939, about two miles west of its last location. In 1944, it moved to its last location at Florence Avenue and Normandie Avenue. The first place at this intersection where Art had a stand was about 20 feet north of Florence, and on the east side of Normandie, in the 1950s he moved to the other location. Art Elkind claims to have invented the chili dog when he was selling hot dogs and chili from a pushcart when someone suggested that he combine the two (other hot dog vendors have disputed this legend). Art Elkind invented his own hot dog steamer, which kept all of hot dog's ingredients at the same temperature, and used a hot dog which was only part pork and had no natural casing, which contributed to his chili dogs' unique flavor.

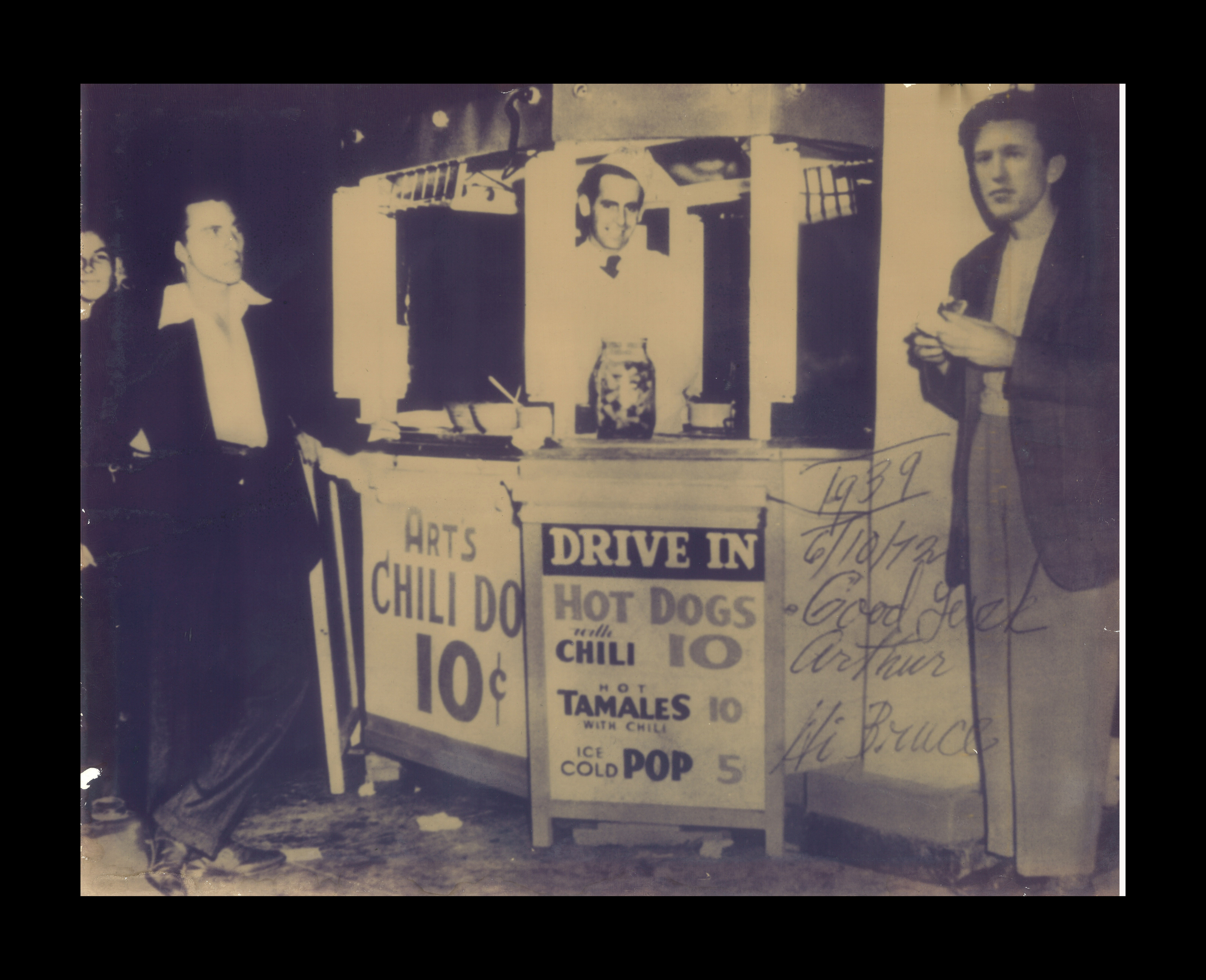
Art's Chili Dog Stand, when chili dogs were only 10 cents each

This stand quickly became well known for its chili dogs and also for the personality of its owner. He was described as a classic New Yorker, who was tough on the outside but kind on the inside. On October 3, 1990 Art Elkind died of a heart attack. The stand was purchased and remodeled in 1994, by its last owners.

== Rodney King riots ==
The intersection at Florence and Normandie, where Art's Famous Chili Dogs was located, is known for being the area which saw the beginning of the Rodney King Riots. Long before the intersection of Florence and Normandie avenues became notorious as the flash point of the 1992 riots, the corner was already renowned for something else—Art's Chili Dogs. For any haute dog aficionado, the mere mention of the now-infamous cross streets conjures images not of violence but of the countless chili cheese dogs that were sold here from 1939 until 2020.

== Reception ==
This restaurant has been well-reviewed by several media outlets in the Los Angeles area. LA Weekly has praised its classical design and it received a five star rating in Shaw's 1972 ratings.

Art's Famous Chili Dog Stand closed in 2020, with March 8, 2020, being its last day of business.

== See also ==
- List of hot dog restaurants
