= Hillbilly Hot Dogs =

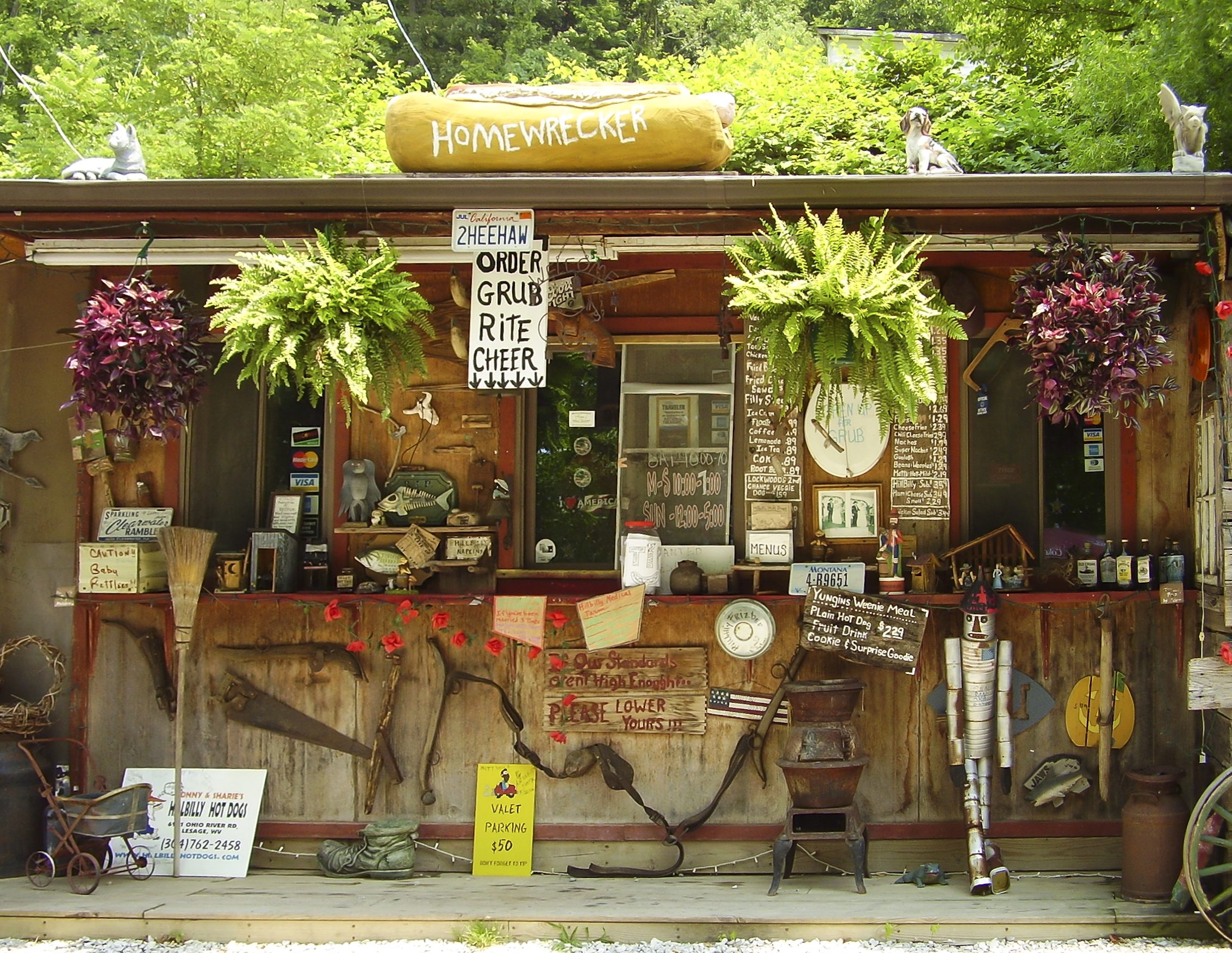
- Hillbilly Hot Dogs, a roadside hot dog stand
- Interactive map of Hillbilly Hot Dogs

Restaurant information
- Established: September 6, 1999
- Food type: Hot dogs and hamburgers
- Dress code: Casual
- Location: 6951 Ohio River Road, Lesage, West Virginia, 25537, United States
- Coordinates: 38°30′23.6″N 82°17′53.5″W
- Other locations: 6951 Ohio River Road, Lesage, West Virginia
- Website: www.hillbillyhotdogs.com

Hillbilly Hot Dogs is a roadside hot dog stand and tourist attraction located near Huntington, West Virginia known for gourmet hot dogs and hamburgers.

== Menu ==
Its offerings include the Homewrecker Hot Dog, which is 15 inches long and "contains three and a half pounds of deep fried sausage and a deep fried one pound weenie topped with sauteed peppers and onion, two kinds of cheese, lettuce, tomatoes, jalapeños, spicy sauce, mustard, ketchup and creamy slaw." It is promoted with an "eat it all in 12 minutes, get a t-shirt and braggin' right" deal. It also sells a 15-pound burger consisting of ten pounds of meat, five pounds of bun, cheese, ketchup, mustard, onions, pickles, tomatoes, and mayonnaise.

Hillbilly Hot Dogs' 10-Pound Burger has been ranked among ABC News' America's fattiest foods.

== Popular culture ==
- Hillbilly Hot Dogs was featured on Food Network's Diners, Drive-Ins, and Dives in 2008 on their Flavortown Favorites Episode and two more times in 2010 and 2020.
- Hillbilly Hot Dogs is a location in the game Fallout 76, as Hillfolk Hot Dogs

== See also ==
- List of hot dog restaurants
