= Walter's Hot Dogs =

Roadside restaurant in New York, United States

- U.S. National Register of Historic Places
- New York State Register of Historic Places
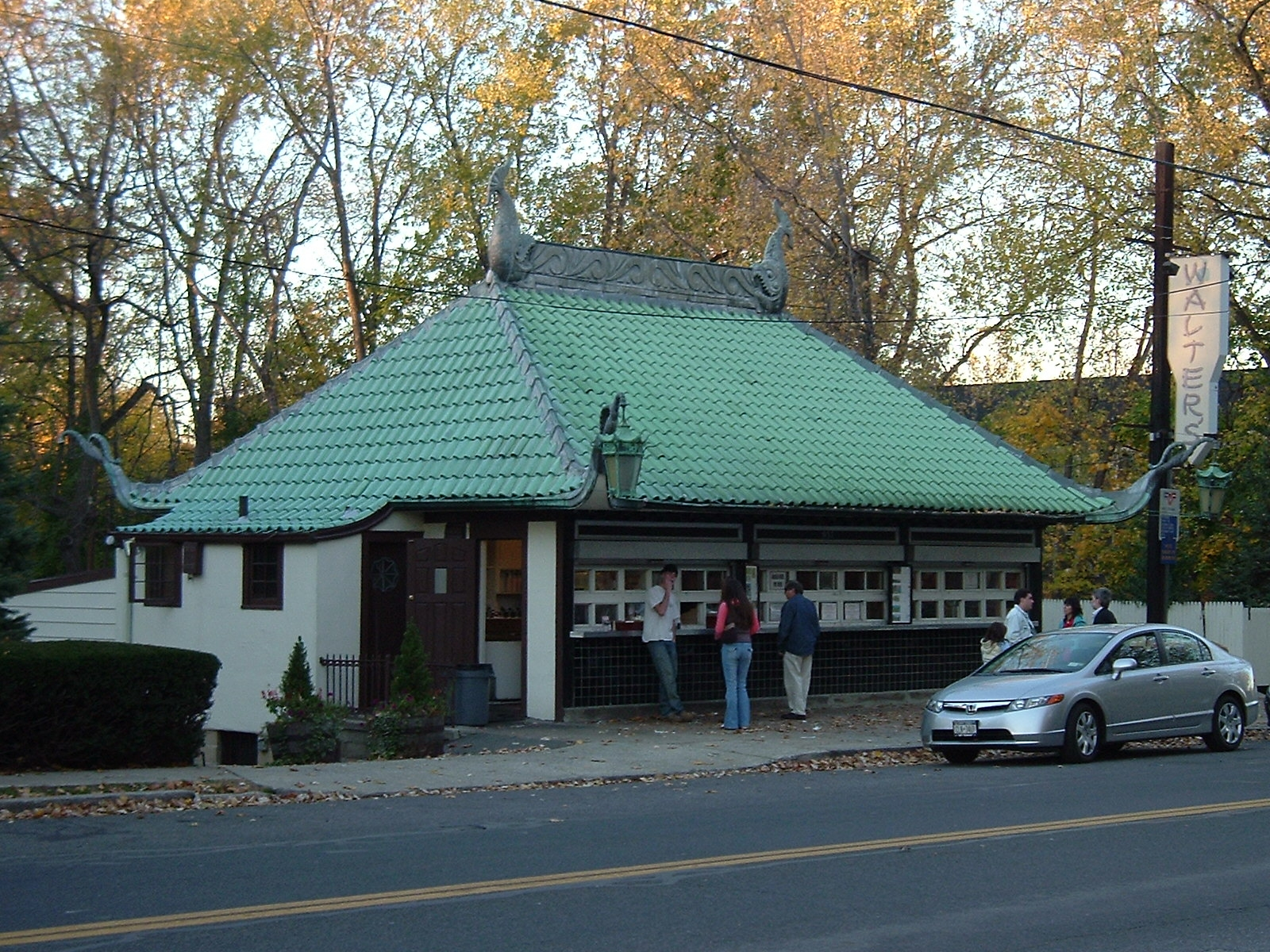

- Location within New York Location within the United States
- Location: 937 Palmer Ave, Mamaroneck, New York
- Coordinates: 40°56′35″N 73°44′49″W
- Built: 1928
- Architectural style: Roadside Architecture
- NRHP reference No.: 10000338
- NYSRHP No.: 11946.000255

Significant dates
- Added to NRHP: June 11, 2010
- Designated NYSRHP: April 26, 2010

Walter's Hot Dogs is a roadside restaurant located in Mamaroneck in Westchester County, New York, established in 1919. The current building dates from 1928 and has been listed on the National Register of Historic Places since 2010.

== History ==
Walter's is a family business founded in 1919 by Walter Warrington in Mamaroneck, N.Y. His first stand, on the Boston Post Road, was in front of Skinner's Floral shop near the then-Central School (now Town of Mamaroneck offices). He sold cider and apples from an orchard he had purchased on Quaker Ridge.

Later, Warrington moved south on the Post Road, in Shepard's Field (approximately where Richbell Road now meets the Post Road). It was here that he began selling his unique brand of hot dogs, blended from beef, pork, and veal, with the wieners split-grilled. At Shepard's Field Walter constructed a cider press to make apple cider.

There were blueprints for a stand to be built on an adjacent property on the Post Road that would include a residence on the second floor. The property was, however, condemned by the School Board; a junior high school was built in 1926 (now a campus of Mamaroneck High). In 1928 Warrington purchased the property at 937 Palmer Avenue, where his then-new pagoda has been since. The shop was closed for renovations for several months in 2014.

The Palmer Avenue building has a pagoda-style copper roof, now oxidized to a light green, and dragon lanterns. It is an example of roadside architecture.

Walter's son Eugene, who owned the business for over 60 years, died in 2017.

Walter's Hot Dogs has since expanded and now has another brick and mortar location in White Plains as well as a fleet of 5 food trucks that can be rented for events.

== Acclaim ==
The stand has been featured in the The New York Times; and on CBS News Sunday Morning in 2003.

In 2010 it was listed on the National Register of Historic Places.

In 2015, The Daily Meal ranked Walter's Hot Dogs #13 in America's 75 Best Hot Dogs

== See also ==
- National Register of Historic Places listings in southern Westchester County, New York

== Sources ==
- "The Artful Hot Dog" by Fred Ferretti. The New York Times. August 12, 1979.
- "Fast Food: The Little Spots" by Lynne Ames. The New York Times. August 14, 1977
