= Polish Boy =

Sausage sandwich

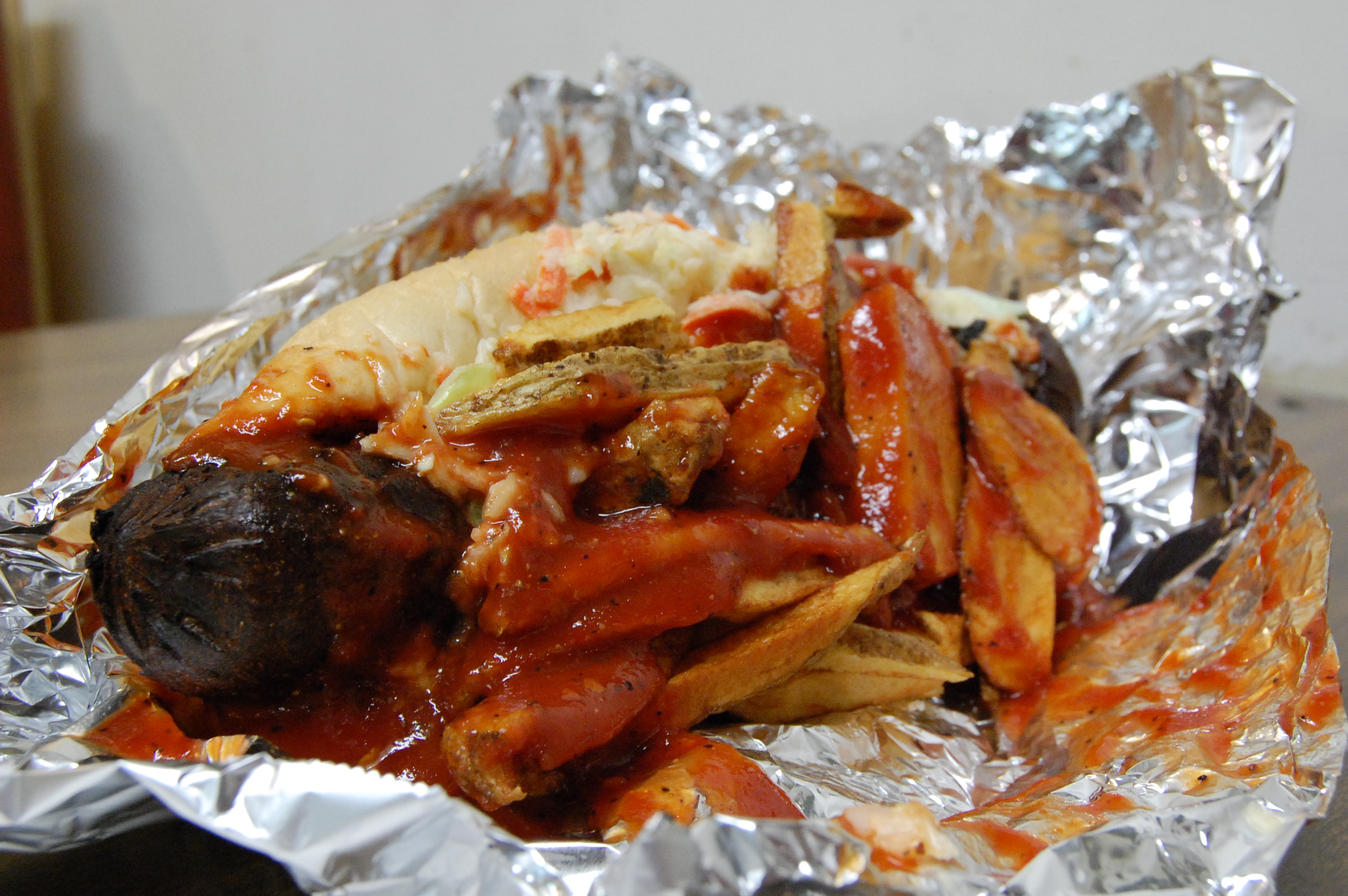
- A Polish boy sandwich from Freddie's Southern Style Rib House
- Type: Sandwich
- Place of origin: United States
- Region or state: Cleveland, Ohio
- Main ingredients: Bun, kielbasa, french fries, coleslaw, and barbeque sauce.

The Polish Boy is a sausage sandwich native to Cleveland, Ohio. It consists of a link of kielbasa sausage placed in a bun, and covered with a layer of french fries, a layer of barbecue sauce and a layer of coleslaw. While the sausage is typically grilled, some establishments will quickly deep fry the sausage after grilling and prior to assembling the sandwich.

While Polish Boys can be found at various establishments throughout Cleveland, a popular place was Freddie's Southern Style Rib House, known for their southern style barbecue sauce. Esquire named theirs as one of the best sandwiches in America, calling it "soul on white."

Chef Michael Symon cited the Polish Boy as "The Best Thing I Ever Ate" on the Food Network, where he featured Seti's Polish Boys on the show. Seti's version had an optional chili and cheese add-on.

Chef Gregby Camp from “Mickey Flickey’s Amazing Wings” appeared on The Wendy Williams Show to teach the audience how to make a Cleveland Polish boy. Chef Camp suggests toasting the bun to give it better flavor and to hold the sandwich together. His sandwich features just enough coleslaw to taste, homemade french fries and their Amazing Comeback Barbecue Sauce.

== Reception ==
The Daily Meal reviewed the Polish boy with "[t]his is one serious sandwich; keep your Tums at the ready" in their article "12 Life-Changing Sandwiches You've Never Heard Of".

== See also ==
- Maxwell Street Polish
- Barbecue sandwich
- Chicago-style hot dog
- Coney Island hot dog
- List of hot dogs
- List of sandwiches
- List of sausage dishes
