= Chicago-style relish =

Condiment

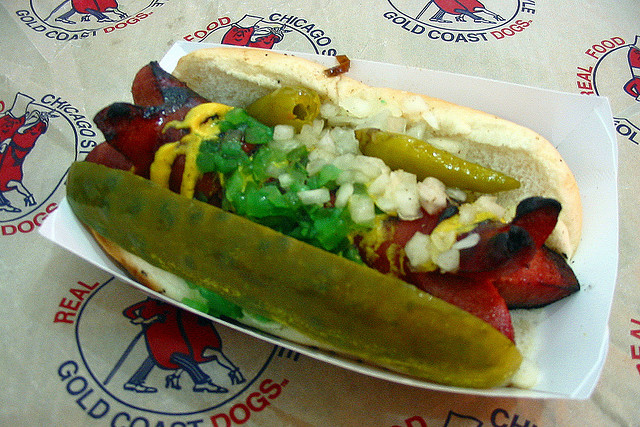
A Chicago-style hot dog with green pickle relish as one of the toppings

Chicago-style relish is a type of pickle relish typically used on Chicago-style hot dogs. It is a sweet and tangy condiment made from finely chopped cucumbers, sugar, vinegar, and other spices. The unique color of the relish, often referred to as "neon green", is created by adding blue dye to regular pickle relish. The first use of Chicago-style relish on a hot dog has been attributed to several different restaurants, including Fluky's and Superdawg.
