= Chicago style =

Chicago style may refer to several things:

- The Chicago Manual of Style, a guideline for writing documents and news reports
- Chicago school (architecture), a style of commercial buildings
- Chicago school of economics, a school of thought among economists and academics
- Chicago blues, a genre of blues music
- Chicago-style dixieland, a genre of jazz music
- Chicago-style pizza, several varieties of pizza
- Chicago-style hot dog, an ingredient-laden variety of hot dog

== See also ==
- Chicago school (disambiguation) several theories of thought
