= Maxwell Street Polish =

Sausage sandwich from Chicago

- Maxwell Street Polish as served by Portillo's in Illinois, cut in half to show the filling
- Type: Sandwich
- Place of origin: United States
- Region or state: Chicago
- Main ingredients: Bun, kielbasa, onions, yellow mustard, optional sport peppers

A Maxwell Street Polish consists of a grilled or fried length of Polish sausage topped with grilled onions and yellow mustard and optional pickled whole, green sport peppers, served on a bun. The sandwich traces its origins to Chicago's Maxwell Street market, and has been called one of "the classic foods synonymous with Chicago".

== History ==
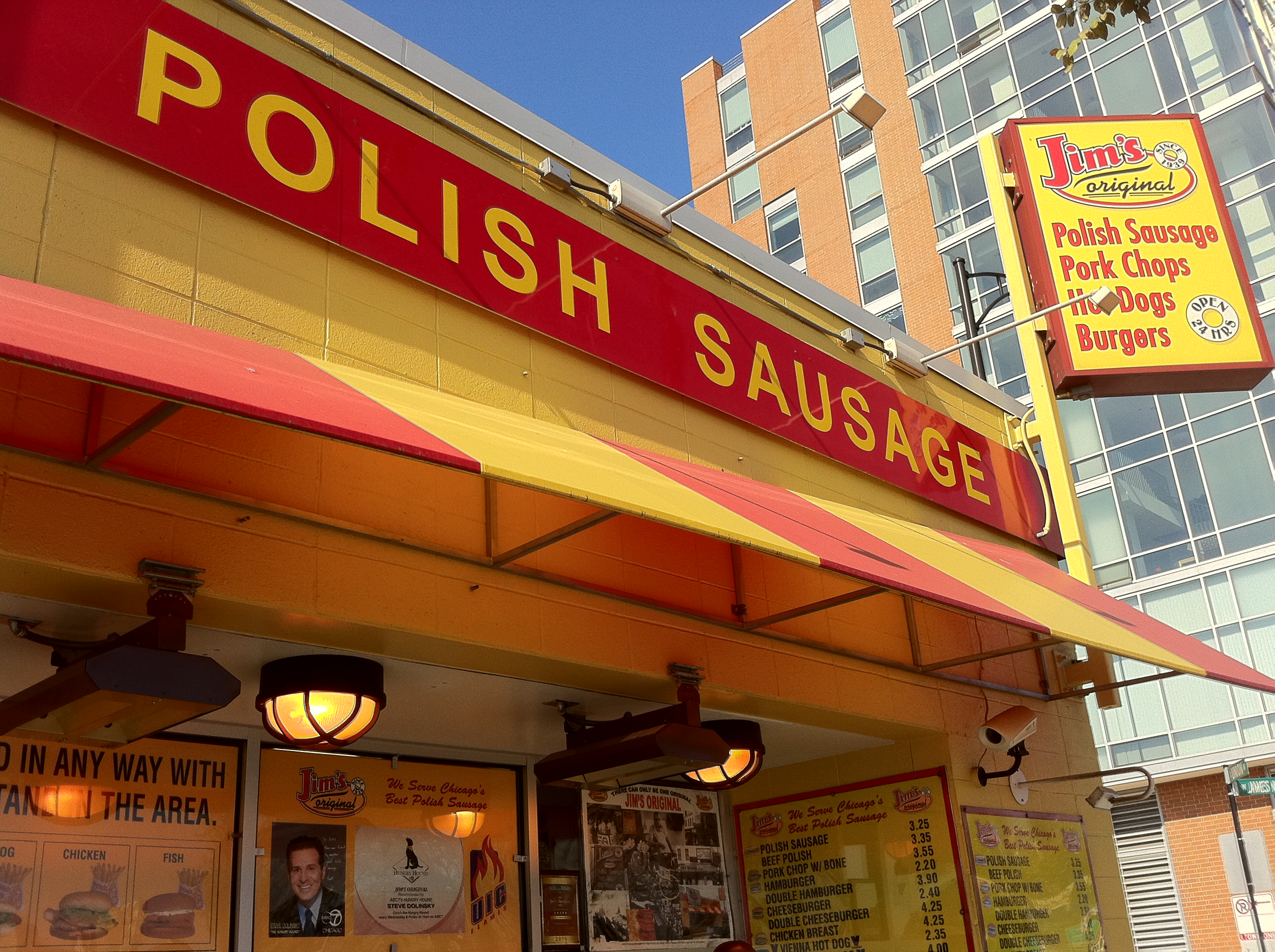
Jim's Original at its current location on Union Avenue, circa 2010

This sandwich is widely said to have been created by Jimmy Stefanovic, a Macedonian immigrant who took over his aunt and uncle's hot dog stand in 1939 (now called Jim's Original) located at Maxwell and Halsted in Chicago's old Maxwell Street market district. The Express Grill, which is located right next door to Jim's, advertises itself as the "Original Maxwell St. Polish" on its marquee, although it arrived after Jim's and serves almost an identical menu. Due to their virtually undivided storefronts and 24-hour service at the original Halsted Street location of both stands, Jim's Original and Express Grill had an added element of confusion for the casual observer not attentive to the change in signage a matter of feet in distance. Despite the competition, the Maxwell Polish sausage sandwich soon grew to be one of Chicago's most popular local offerings, along with the Chicago-style hot dog and the Italian beef sandwich.

Due to the University of Illinois Chicago's (UIC) South Campus development the Maxwell Street market district was razed and the two stands moved in 2005. After decades of coexisting at the intersection of Halsted and Maxwell Streets, the two have relocated their side-by-side competition a half block east onto Union Avenue, adjacent to the Dan Ryan Expressway on-ramp at Roosevelt Road.

Maxwell Polish are a staple of hot dog stands and today are found throughout the city and suburbs, including at restaurant chains such as Portillo's and Brown's Chicken, and is available at most sports venues in the area serving concessions. Most of the 24-hour stands (such as the original Express Grill and its neighboring competition, Jim's Original) also serve the pork chop sandwich popularized alongside the Polish sausage sandwich during the days of the old Maxwell Street market.

In September 2021, the Jim's Original stand announced that they will be closed from 1 to 6 a.m. due to pressure from the landlord, UIC, over "neighborhood safety reasons". As of July 2026, Jim's has announced plans to move from the Maxwell area to a new Pilsen space.

== Sausage ==
The main feature of the sandwich is the sausage, which is widely available in grocery and specialty retail stores throughout the Chicago area. It is typically marketed as the "Maxwell Street" variety, which is a Chicago-specific variation of kielbasa distinguished by it being typically more seasoned and made from a combination of both beef and pork. The two largest manufacturers of this particular style of Polish sausage in Chicago are Vienna Beef and the Bobak Sausage Company.

== Gallery ==
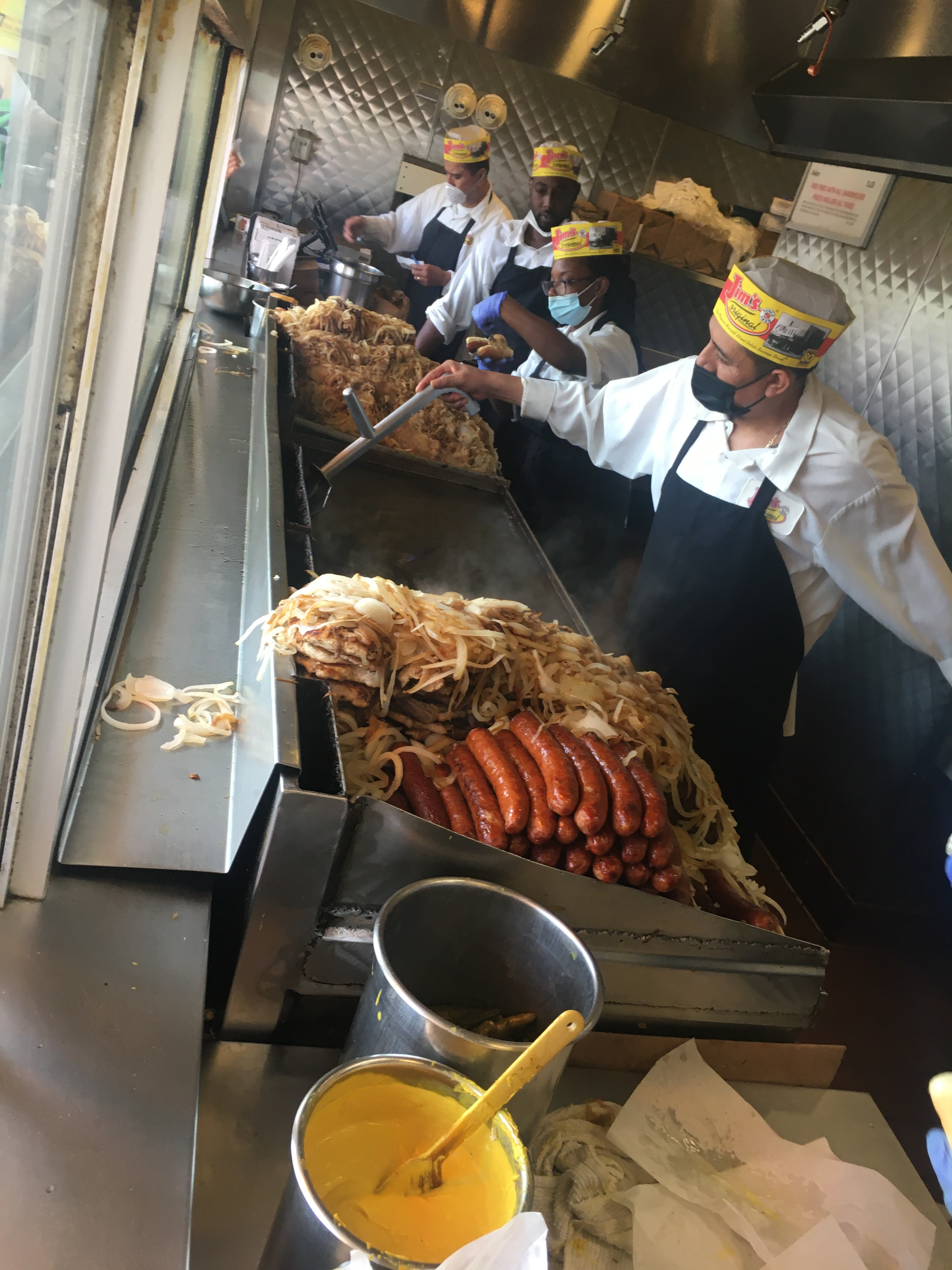
Polish sausages, with the accompanying onions, on the grill with mustard and sport peppers in containers

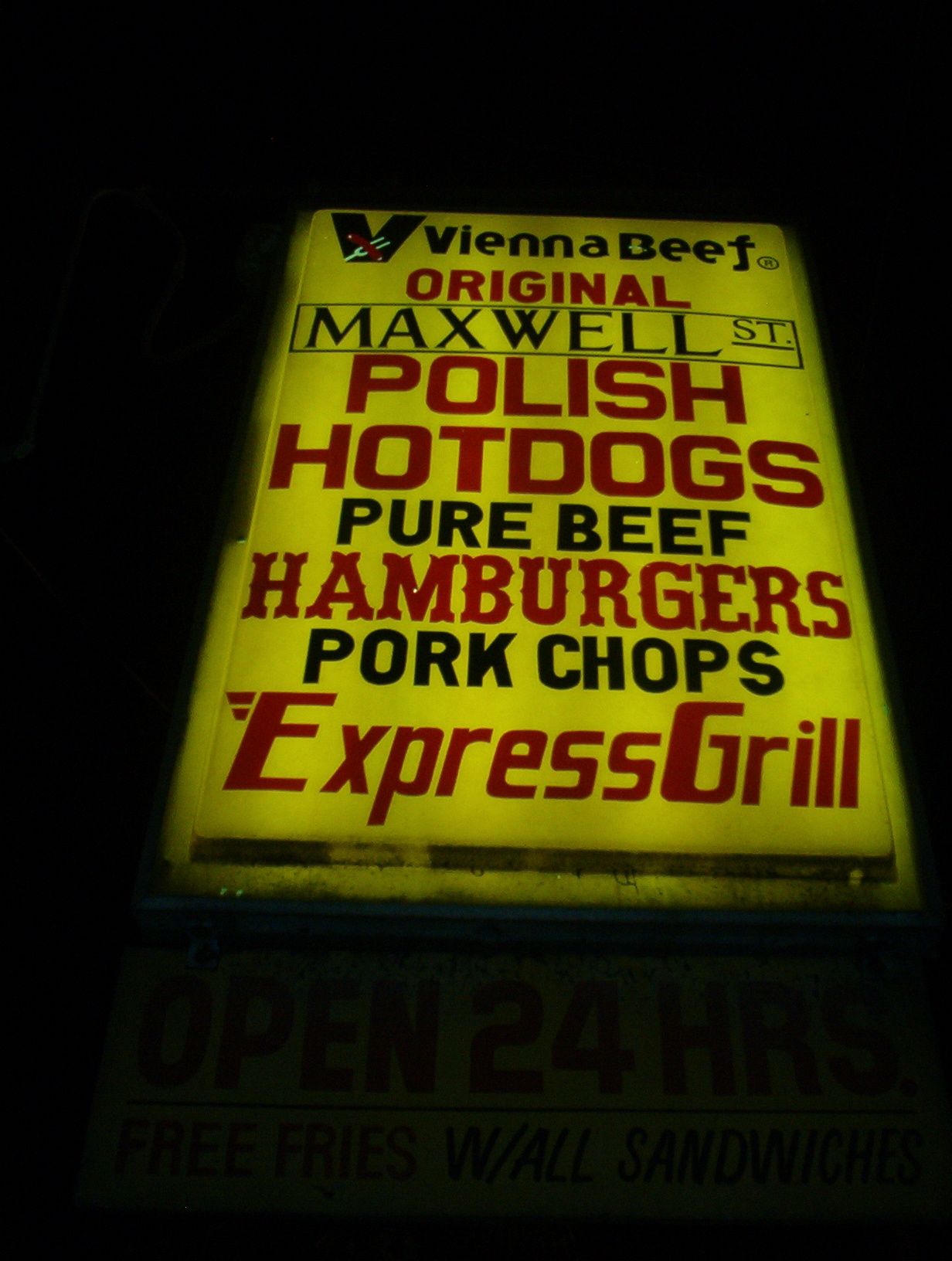
The sign at the original Express Grill location on Halsted

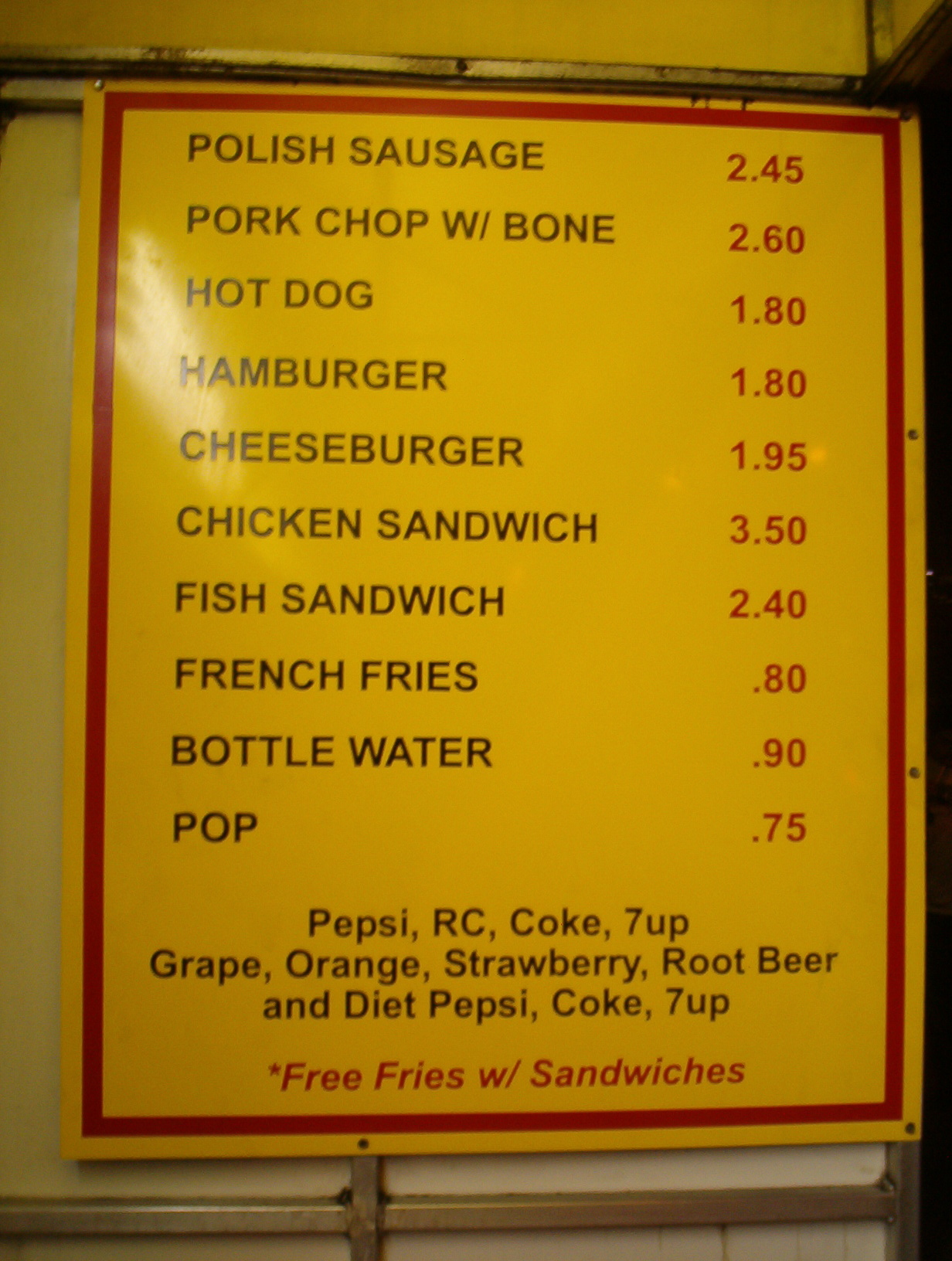
Price list at the Express Grill

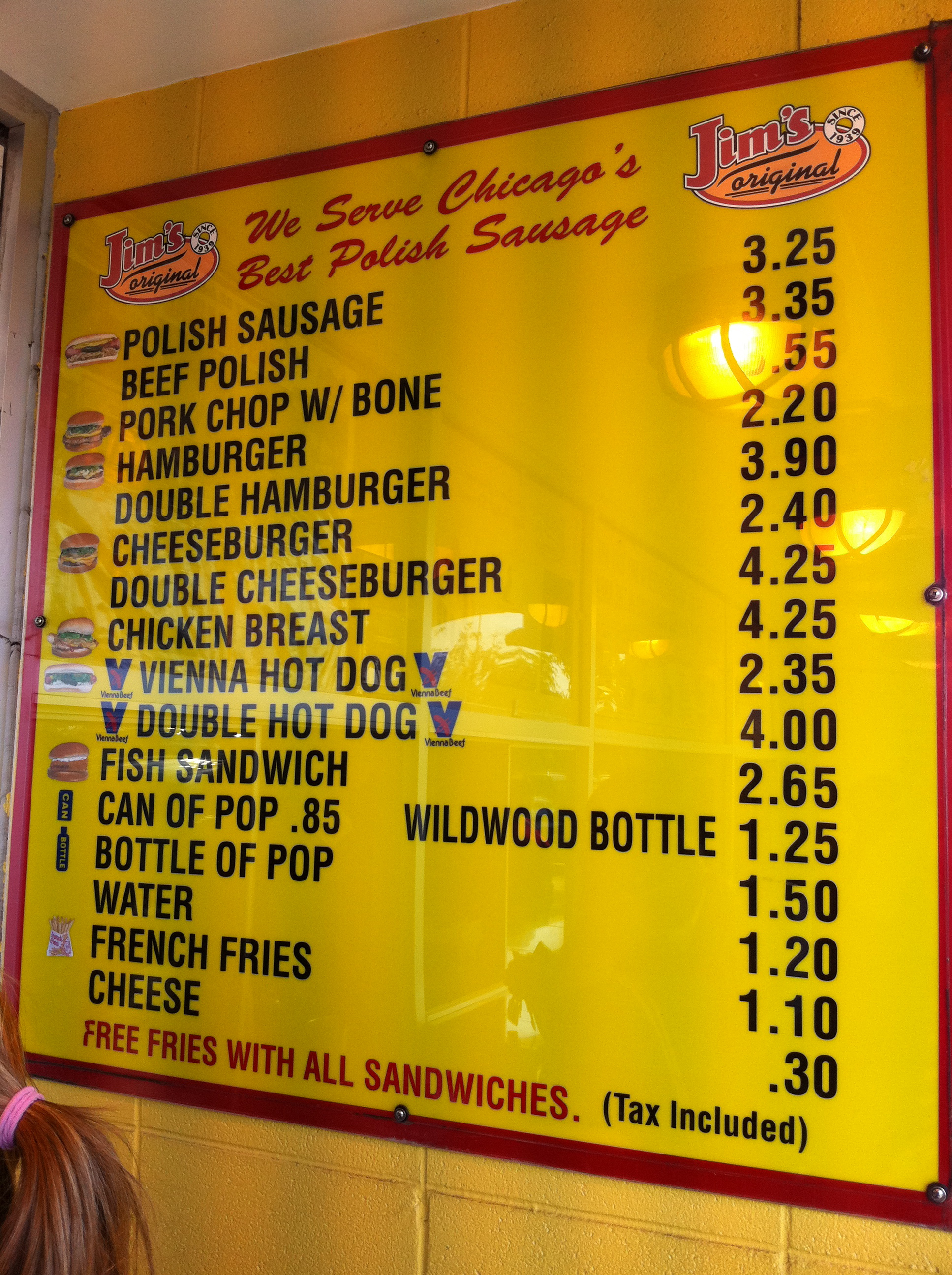
The menu at Jim's Original

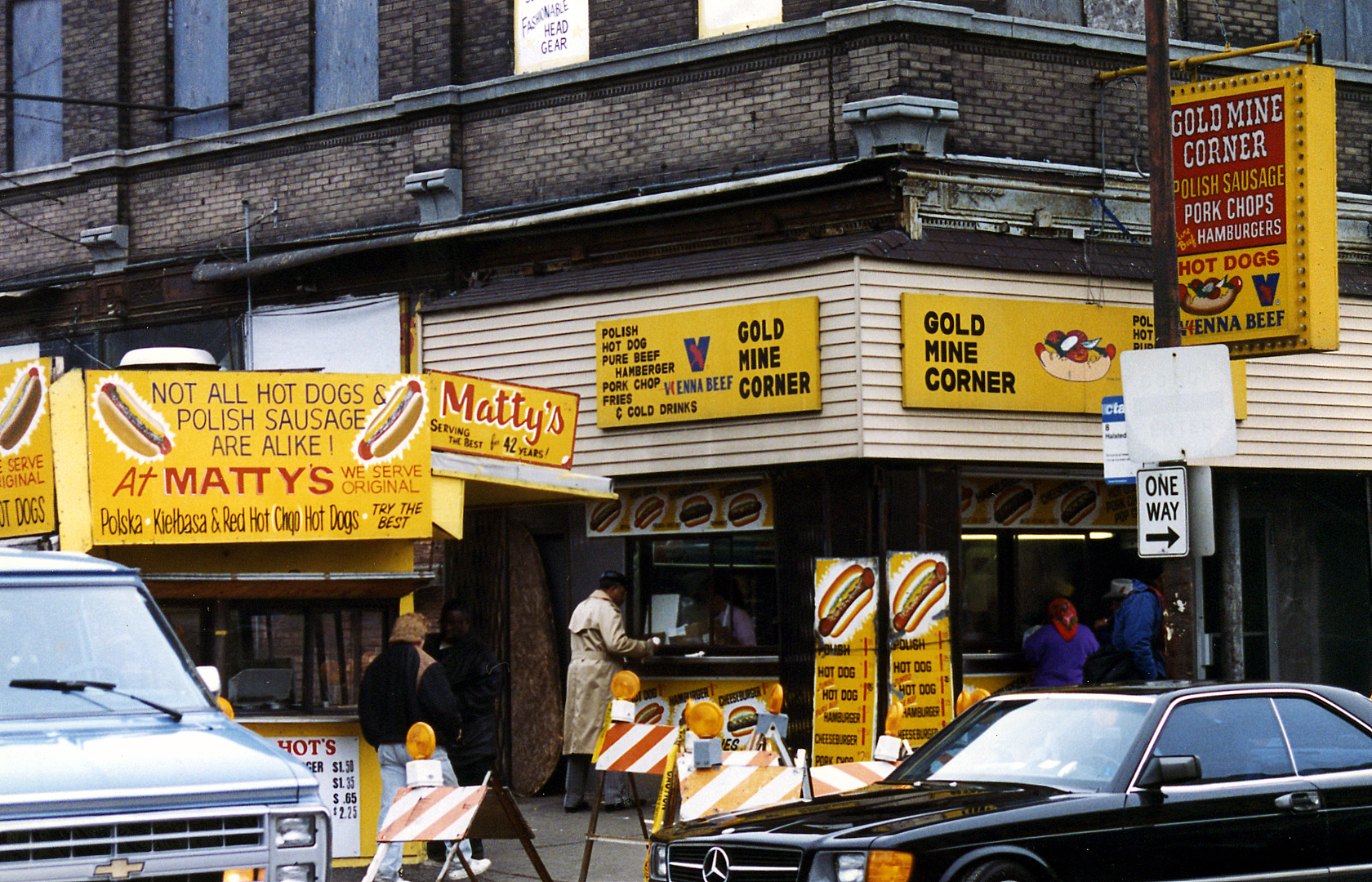
Maxwell Street Polish for sale in 1993

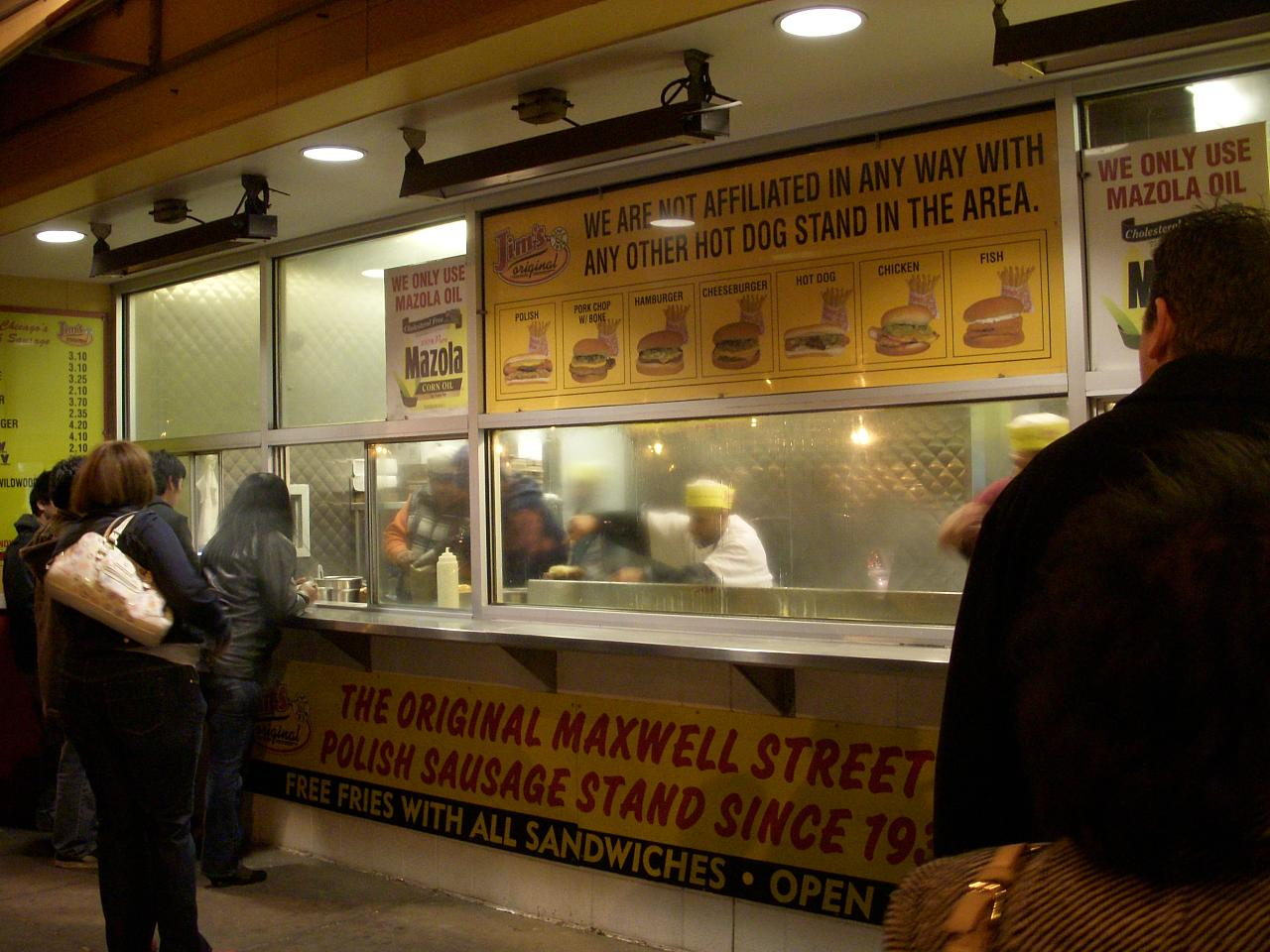
Maxwell Street Polish Hot Dog Stand in service at 4:00 a.m. in 2008

== See also ==
- Chicago culture
- Hot dog variations
- List of hot dogs
- Maxwell Street Depot
- Polish Boy
- The Wieners Circle
