= Gene & Jude's =

Hot dog stand in River Grove, Illinois, U.S.

Gene's and Jude's
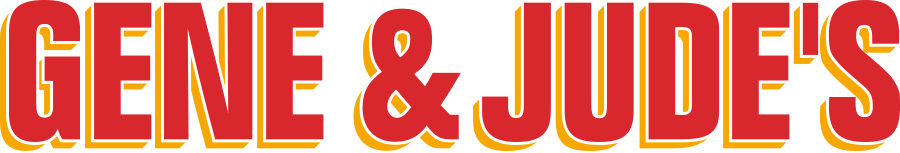

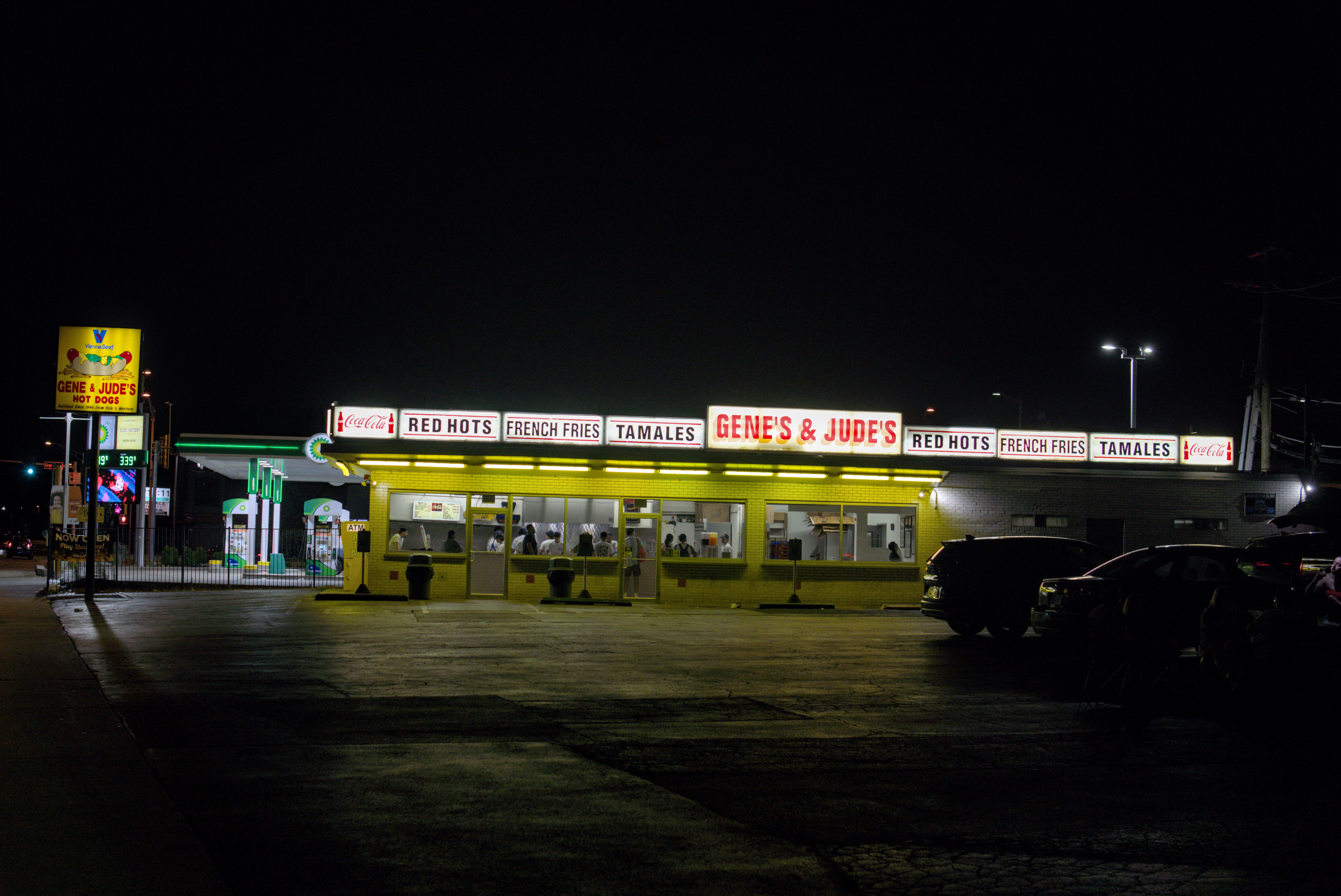
- Gene and Jude's in 2025
- Interactive map of Gene's and Jude's

Restaurant information
- Established: 1946
- Owner: J Mormino
- Food type: Chicago-style hot dog
- Location: 2720 N River Road, River Grove, Illinois, 60171, United States
- Coordinates: 41°55′48″N 87°50′48″W
- Website: geneandjudes.com

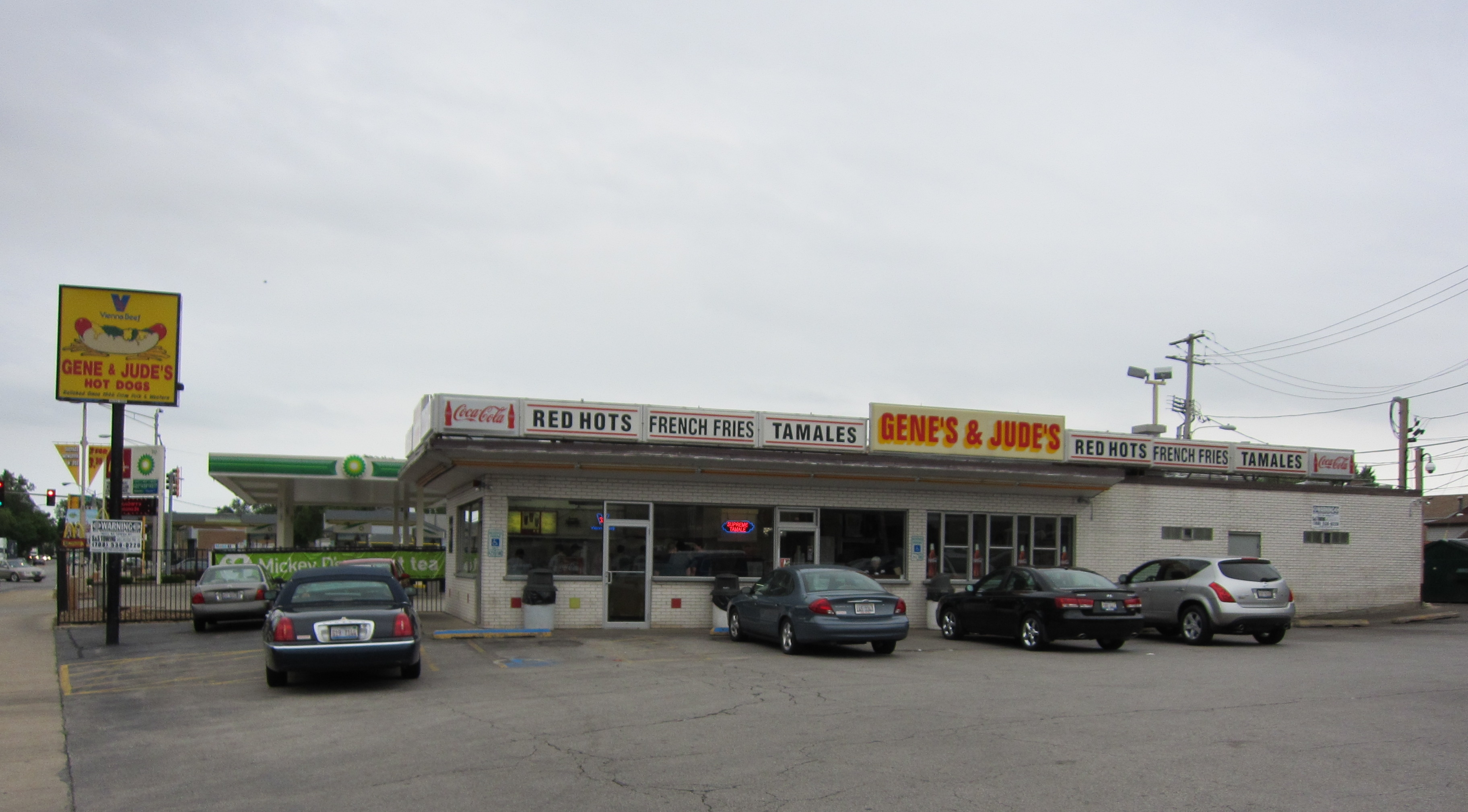
Gene & Jude's

Gene & Jude's is a hot dog stand in River Grove, Illinois, founded in 1946 by Chicago city worker Gene Mormino. The stand is famous for its limited approach to the Chicago-style hot dog, its toppings departing from tradition by including only mustard, onions, relish, sport peppers and fresh cut French fries placed on top, known as a Depression Dog. The menu is limited to hot dogs, double dogs, tamales and fries, and notably lacks ketchup.

== History ==
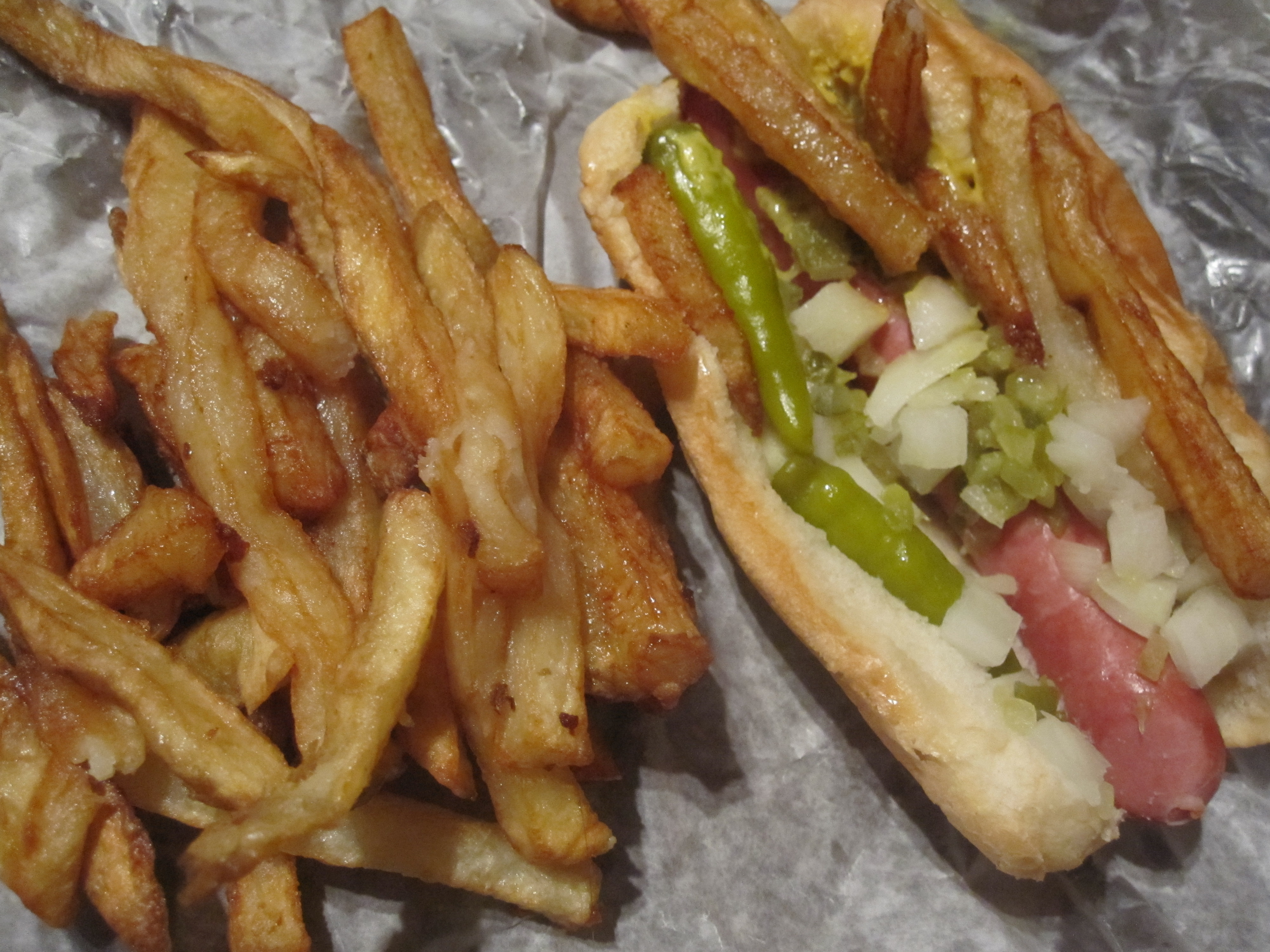
Regular hot dog with everything

In 1946 city worker Gene Mormino was at a Cubs game at Wrigley Field when Mormino decided if he added French fries to his hot dog it would give it a gratifying dose of saltiness and crunchiness. Based on that idea, he started a hot dog stand at Polk & Western Streets in Chicago. The restaurant quickly gained popularity, but three years later Mormino lost the entire stand in a card game in 1949.

In 1950 Mormino gathered enough money and moved operations to the current location in River Grove, Illinois also taking in friend and co-worker Jude DeSantis. During the 50s, Gene and Jude's was a frame building and was not actually called Gene & Jude's - the sign of the stand simply said "Vienna Red Hots." Customers referred to it as "River Road Hot Dogs" or "Vienna's." During the 1950s, Gene & Jude's had a takeout window, and its drinks were sold in bottles.

Gene and Jude's is still family owned and operated.

In 2006, Gene's & Jude's was inducted into the Vienna Beef Hot Dog Hall of Fame. In 2011, in a competition of 64 hot dog stands across the country, it was chosen by the magazine "Every Day with Rachael Ray" and the food blog Serious Eats as the best hot dog in America.
