= Karen's Diner =

Australian chain of theme restaurants

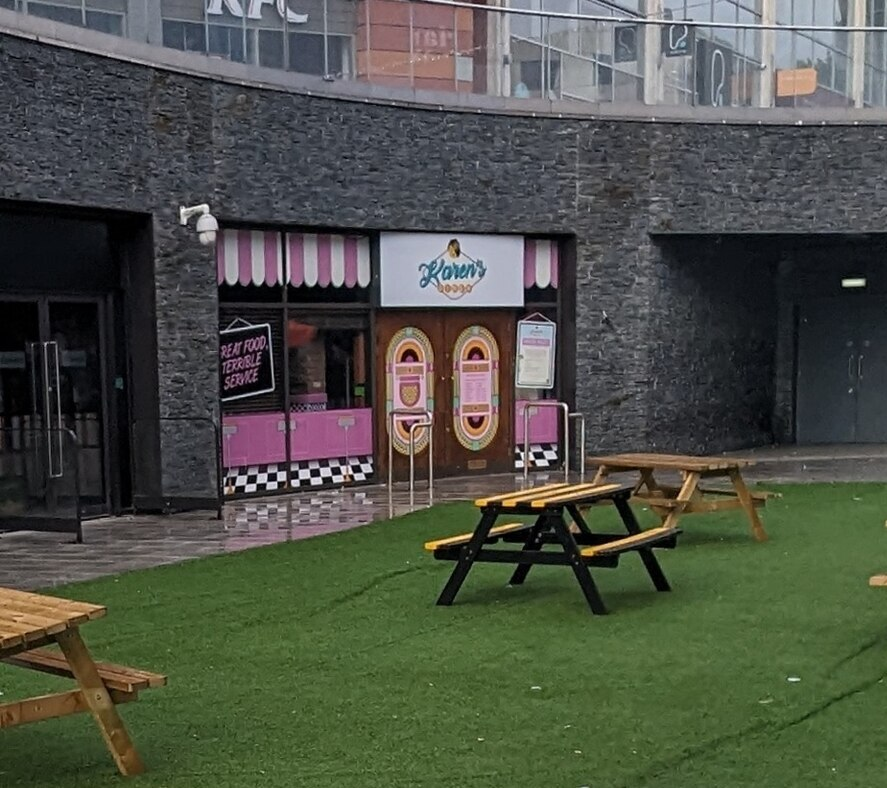
- Newport, Wales, location
- Type: Privately held company
- Industry: Theme restaurants
- Founded: 2021
- Founders: Aden Levin; James Farrell
- Defunct: 2025
- Headquarters: Sydney, Australia
- Products: Hamburgers, chicken wings

Karen's Diner was an Australian chain of theme restaurants. The restaurant was known for advertising a deliberately unpleasant dining experience, and staff were instructed to insult customers throughout their meal. The restaurant's name came from the internet slang term Karen, used to describe an older white woman perceived as entitled or excessively demanding.

== History ==
The chain was established in 2021 in Sydney by Aden Levin and James Farrell. It was a theme restaurant based around the concept of an unpleasant dining experience where customers pay for employees to insult them. The restaurant was originally planned to be a six-month pop-up restaurant at World Square. The restaurant's concept initially drew a mixed response, raising concerns about whether the environment of mutual insults would expose employees to abuse by customers.

The name Karen's is a reference to the use of the name Karen in internet memes to describe a stereotypically rude or entitled middle-aged white woman. Staff were instructed to put on an abrasive persona and comically ridicule customers during their meal. Customers were expected to return this behaviour by acting rudely towards the staff. However, customers and staff were prohibited from using insults based on racism, sexism or homophobia. Many of these exchanges included profanity, and people under the age of 16 must be accompanied by adults. Patrons who had an ID showing that their name was Karen received a free drink.

The restaurant was inspired by American diners in the 1950s, and the menu featured hamburgers and chicken wings. It became a popular source of content for social media, particularly on platform TikTok, as customers posted videos of their interactions with staff. The chain opened locations in the United Kingdom, the United States, Indonesia, and New Zealand. The chain expanded to New Zealand, opening a restaurant in Mount Eden in August 2022.

In August 2022, the restaurant drew controversy after a video allegedly showing a staff member at a Brisbane location behaving inappropriately went viral on TikTok. In the video, the server makes inappropriate remarks about an underage patron and accuses her father, who was dining with her, of being a pedophile. A spokesperson for the chain claimed that an investigation had been launched and that stricter training protocols would be introduced in response.

In May 2023, Viral Ventures (Australia), a company which owned most of the chain's Australian restaurants, went into liquidation. In July 2023, Viral Ventures NZ also went into liquidation.

In 2025, their final UK restaurant closed.

== See also ==
- Dick's Last Resort
- The Wieners Circle
