= Redhot Ranch =

Hot dog stand chain in Chicago, Illinois, US

Red Hot Ranch

Restaurant information
- Established: 2005
- Owner(s): Barry Nemerow and Jeff Greenfield
- Food type: Chicago hot dog stand
- Location: 500 W 35th St. Chicago, IL 60616
- Coordinates: 41°49′51.7″N 87°38′20.4″W
- Other locations: 2449 W Armitage Ave, Chicago, IL 60647 3057 N Ashland Ave, Chicago, IL 60657

Redhot Ranch (also spelled Red Hot Ranch) is a three-location hot dog stand in Chicago, Illinois, founded by Barry Nemerow and Jeff Greenfield, who also founded The Wieners Circle. They opened 35th Street Red Hots in 2005 on the south side of Chicago a short walk from White Sox Park.

The stand is famous for its limited approach to the Chicago-style hot dog, its toppings departing from tradition by including only mustard, onions, relish, sport peppers and fresh cut French fries placed on top, known as a Depression Dog.

The duo opened two more locations in 2014 that served a double cheeseburger modeled on the In-N-Out Burger. The burger has been highlighted by Chicago Tribune for the #2 french fries in the city, and #12 best cheeseburger in the city, the #3 hot dog in Chicago on Serious Eats, and the restaurant was a subject on Check, Please!, a television show dedicated to Chicago restaurants. The menu is limited to hot dogs, hamburgers, french fries, fried shrimp, milkshakes, and a cod sandwich.
