= Dick's Last Resort =

Bar and restaurant chain in the United States

- Type: Privately owned
- Industry: Restaurant
- Founded: 1985
- Headquarters: Las Vegas, Nevada
- Number of locations: 12
- Areas served: Southeastern and Southwestern United States
- Website: dickslastresort.com

Dick's Last Resort is a bar and restaurant chain in the United States known for its intentional employment of obnoxious staff who "purposely provide bad service". The chain was founded in Dallas, Texas, in 1985 by Richard "Dick" Chase and currently operates thirteen locations across the United States.

In 1995, the company attempted to expand to Europe and opened a restaurant in London, but the effort was abandoned and the restaurant was sold in early 1996.

== Atmosphere ==
Dick's Last Resort teaches its servers to be obnoxious. In addition to the staff, the decor is considered to be "wacky". The restaurants can have mismatched furniture and paper tablecloths. Patrons of Dick's are expected to be insulted, or placed in uncomfortable situations. A staple of Dick's is their hand-made paper hats with insults written on them given to diners to wear during their stay. Guests may have napkins and straws thrown at them by the serving staff.

== Menu ==
Dick's menu is influenced by Southern cuisine, consisting of wings, burgers, ribs, chicken, and select seafood items.

In addition to food and drink, Dick's offers souvenirs such as "Putting the F.U. in Fun" T-shirts and "I Love Dick's" bumper stickers.

== See also ==
- Edsel Ford Fong, known as the "world's rudest, worst, most insulting waiter"
- The Wieners Circle, a Chicago-based hot dog joint staffed with profanity-spewing staff
- Karen's Diner, a now defunct retro-and pink-themed diner with intentionally rude staff
- Cencio la Parolaccia in Rome, Italy
