= Superdog =

Superdog may refer to:

- Krypto, also known as Krypto the Superdog, Superman's pet dog in various Superman comics
- Krypto the Superdog (TV series), an American animated television series
- Superdawg, a drive-in hot dog stand in Chicago
