= Cencio la Parolaccia =

Restaurant in Rome, Italy

- Interactive map of Cencio la Parolaccia

Restaurant information
- Established: 1941
- Owner: Alice Waters
- Food type: Roman cuisine
- Location: Vicolo del Cinque, 3, Rome, Metropolitan City of Rome Capital, Lazio, 00153, Italy
- Coordinates: 41.8905°N 12.4689°E
- Website: cenciolaparolaccia.it

Cencio la Parolaccia (pronounced [ˈtʃɛntʃo la paroˈlattʃa]; la parolaccia being Italian for 'the curse word') is a restaurant in the Trastevere rione of Rome. It is mostly famous for the behaviour of its waiters, who curse at or otherwise verbally abuse the diners, including tourists. The restaurant mainly serves Roman cuisine.

== History ==
The restaurant, initially called Osteria da Cencio (Cencio's eatery), was opened in 1941 by the couple Vincenzo "Cencio" and Renata de Santis who decided, following an episode involving the actor Massimo Serato, to combine traditional food with a form of entertainment based on folk songs often seasoned with risque jokes and profanities in the Romanesco dialect.

The establishment became popular with the public and so in 1951, it officially took the name "La Parolaccia" and became a place for special dinners for actors and people in the show business.

== Film references ==
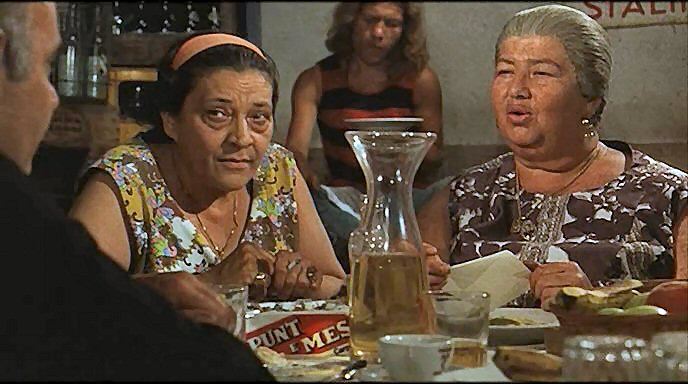
Vittorio Caprioli, Marcella Valeri, and Mickey Fox at "La Parolaccia" in a scene from the film Trastevere (1971)

Thanks to its peculiarity, La Parolaccia has inspired the mention of fictitious restaurants in various comedy films such as Made in Italy (1965), Simpatici & antipatici (1998), and in 1981, Fracchia la belva umana (where it is renamed "Da Sergio e Bruno - Gli Incivili") as well as in the 1977 poliziottesco La banda del trucido with Tomas Milian (here the restaurant is called "La Pernacchia" - The Raspberry). La Parolaccia itself is mentioned and used in some scenes of the 1971 movie Trastevere, in which it is managed by the salacious Nanda, played by Ottavia Piccolo.

== See also ==
- The Wieners Circle
- Coach and Horses, Soho
- Wong Kei
- Dick's Last Resort
- Sam Wo
