= Maxwell Street Depot =

Fast-food restaurant in Chicago, Illinois

Coordinates: 41°50′16.9″N 87°38′13.7″W

The Maxwell Street Depot
- Interactive map of The Maxwell Street Depot

Restaurant information
- Food type: Fast food
- Location: 31st Street and Canal Street, Chicago, Illinois, United States

The Maxwell Street Depot is a 24-hour fast-food restaurant in the South Side of Chicago, Illinois. It is located at 31st Street and Canal Street in the Bridgeport neighborhood.

The Maxwell Street Depot is one of a number of Chicago food stands that sells the Maxwell Street Polish, a Polish sausage topped with grilled onions, yellow mustard, and pickled whole sport peppers. The counter service-only location is also known for its pork chop sandwiches, and sells other grill items such as hot dogs, hamburgers, and French fries.
