= Fluky's =

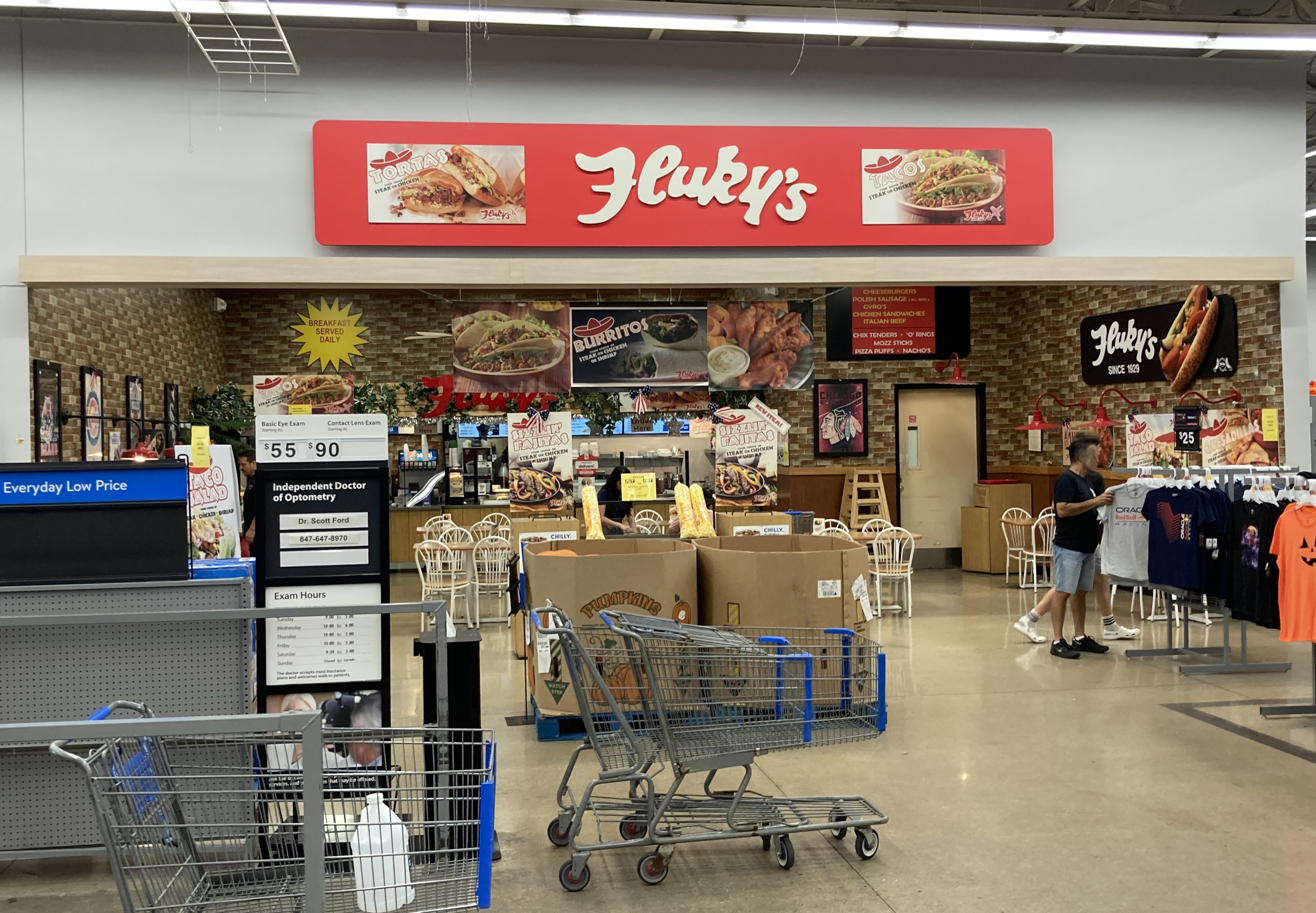
- Niles location in 2023
- Interactive map of Fluky's

Restaurant information
- Established: 1929
- Location: 5630 Touhy Ave., Niles, Cook, Illinois, 60714, United States
- Coordinates: 42.014944°N 87.768611°W

Fluky's is a Chicago-area fast food restaurant and mail-order food purveyor known for hot dogs.

== History ==
Fluky's began in Chicago in 1929 on Maxwell and Halsted streets. Founded by Abe Drexler, the original stand "claims to have invented" the Chicago-style hot dog. They sold what was known as a "Depression Sandwich," a frankfurter on a bun with mustard, pickle relish, onion, dill pickle, an unspecified pepper, lettuce, and tomatoes, accompanied by french fries, for 5 cents.

Still owned by the Drexler family, Fluky's maintains an in-store restaurant in a Walmart in Niles, Illinois. The one-time chain had dwindled by the time the last location in Chicago at 6821 N. Western Avenue changed its name to U Lucky Dawg on February 14, 2006; that site had been owned by a licensee for the previous ten years. A later location in Buffalo Grove, Illinois, was open only a short time.
