= Chicago-style hot dog =

Regional variation of the American hot dog

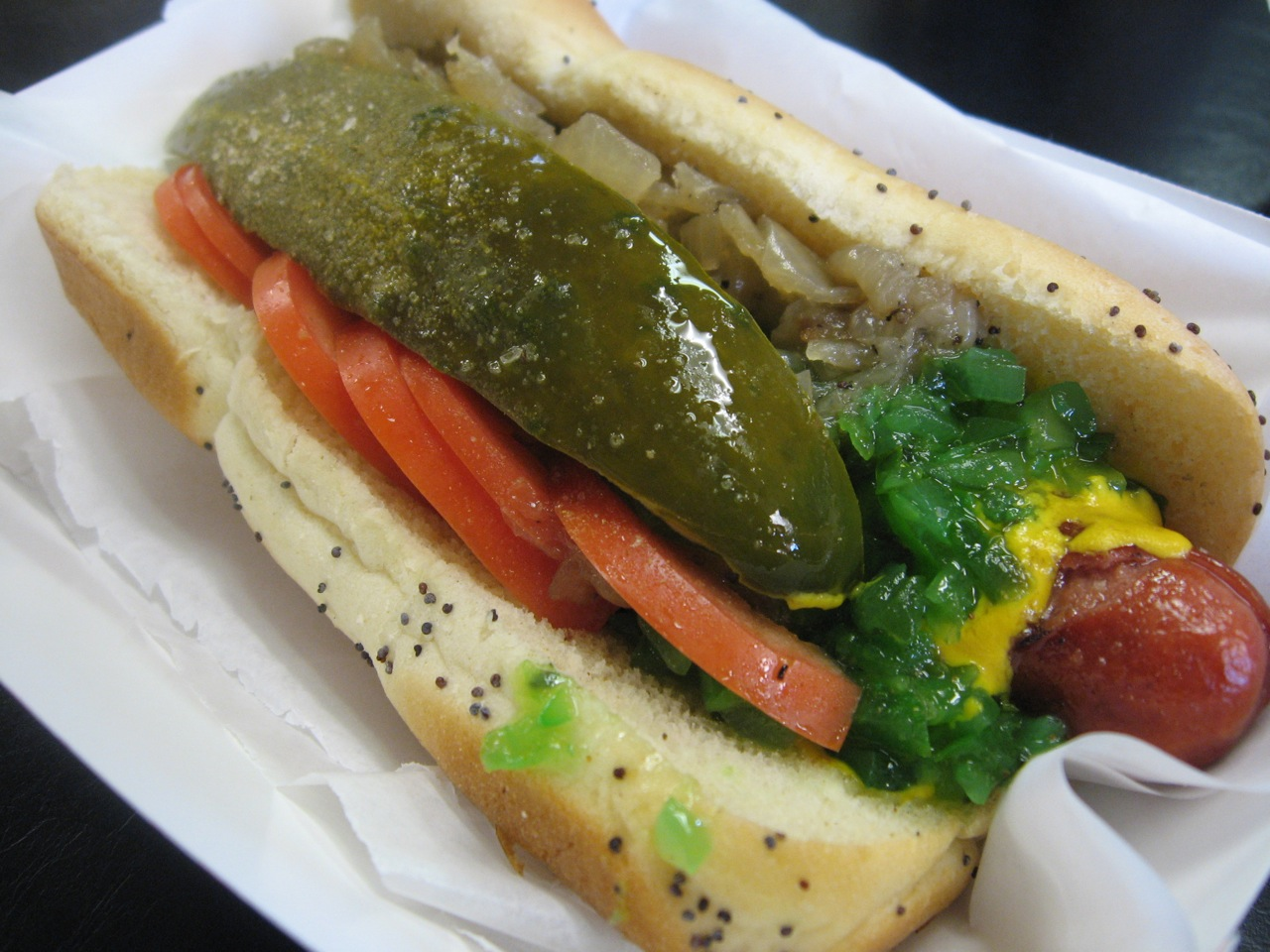
- Alternative names: Chicago red hot
- Course: Main course
- Place of origin: United States
- Region or state: Chicago, Illinois
- Serving temperature: Hot
- Main ingredients: Frankfurter, poppy seed bun, yellow mustard, white onion, Chicago-style relish, pickled sport peppers (a variety of Capsicum annuum), tomatoes, kosher dill pickle spear, celery salt

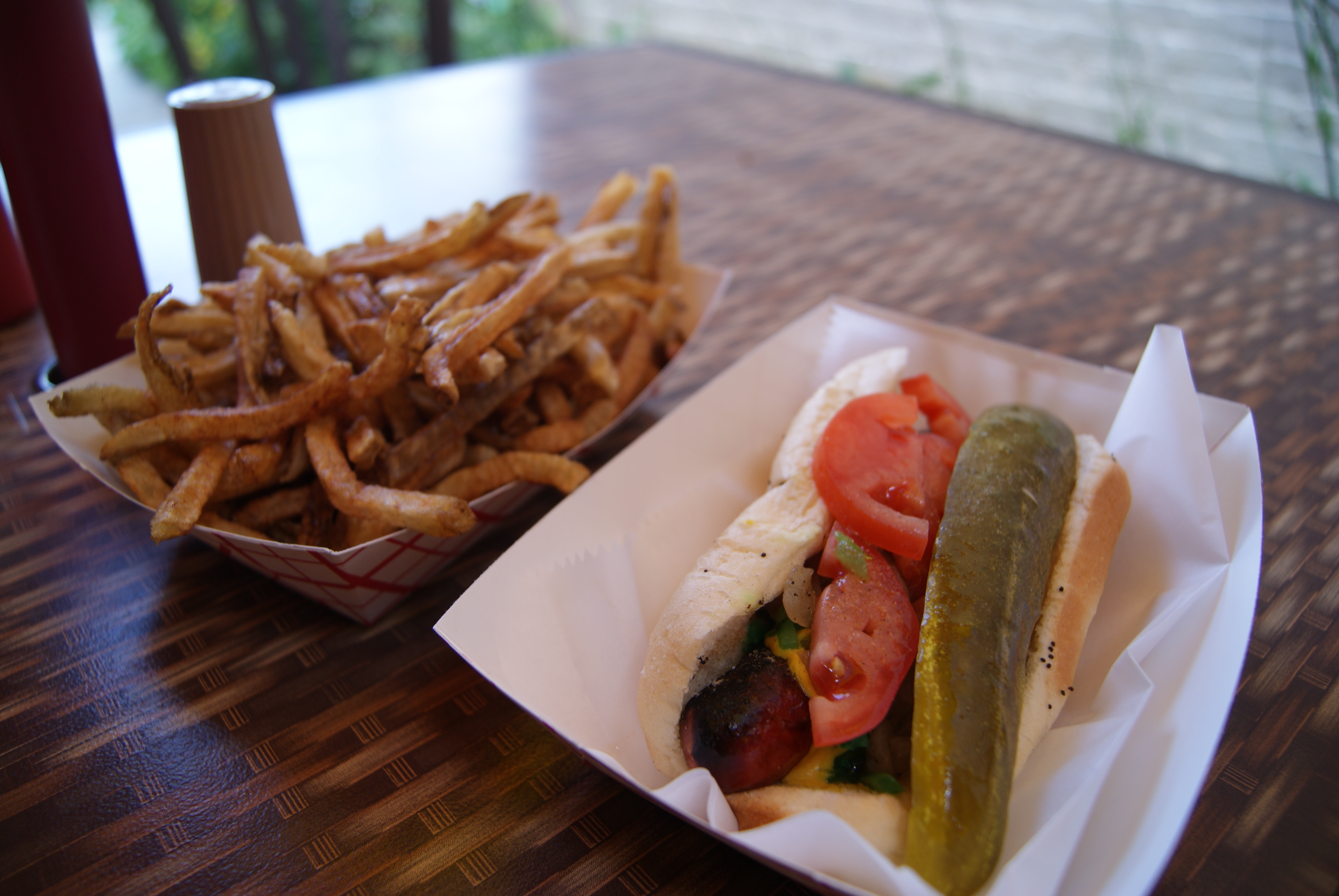
Chicago-style hot dog with duck-fat fries

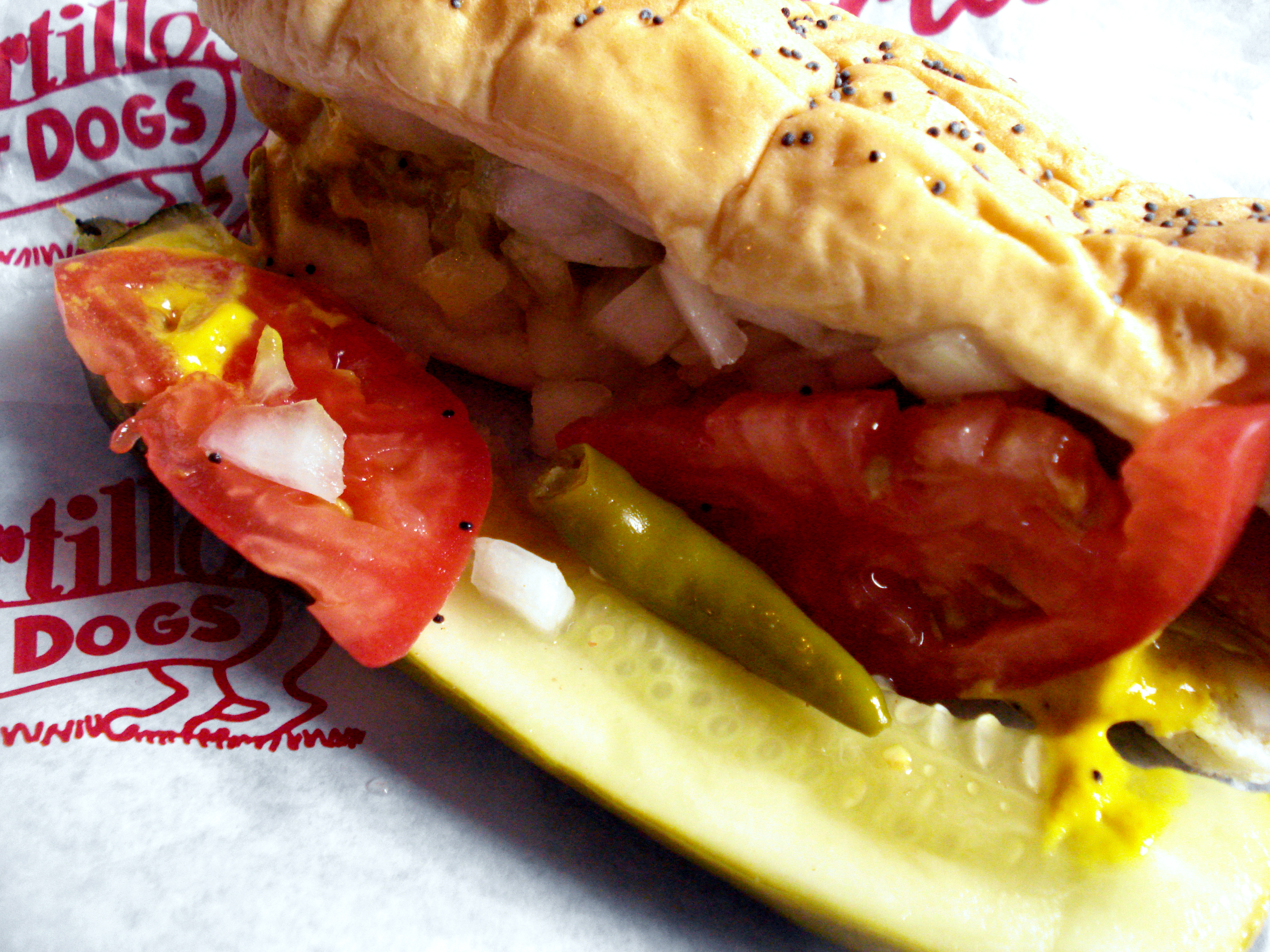
Chicago-style hot dog at Portillo's

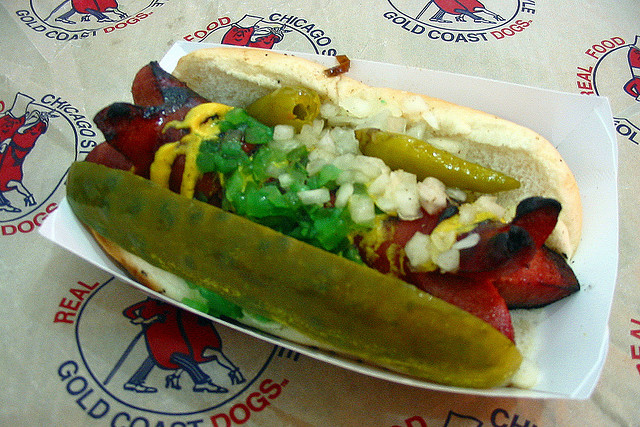
A char-dog with ends cut cervelat-style

A Chicago-style hot dog, Chicago dog, or Chicago red hot is a hot dog made with a natural casing all-beef frankfurter (most often the Vienna Beef brand), that is typically served on a poppy seed bun and topped with yellow mustard, chopped white onions, neon relish, a dill pickle spear, tomato slices or wedges, pickled sport peppers, and a dash of celery salt. It originates from and is considered a defining symbol of Chicago, Illinois.

The complete assembly of a Chicago hot dog is said to be "dragged through the garden" due to the many vegetable toppings. The method for cooking the hot dog varies depending on the vendor's preference. Most often they are steamed or water-simmered, or less often grilled over charcoal (in which case they are referred to as "char-dogs").

Vienna Beef's 'canonical' recipe does not include ketchup, and there is a widely shared consensus among most Chicagoans and aficionados that ketchup is an unacceptable addition, as its sweetness can overwhelm the salty and savory flavors of the Chicago dog's vegetable toppings. A number of Chicago hot dog vendors outright refuse to offer ketchup as a topping, and some vendors even enforce rules against ketchup or post signs mocking the practice. The negative perception of ketchup in Chicago also ties back to the Chicago dog's Depression-era origins, during which ketchup was often used to mask the flavor of spoiled and low-quality meat.

== History ==
=== The all-beef frankfurter ===
The hot dog itself originates with the frankfurter würstchen, an all-pork sausage eaten in Frankfurt, Germany as early as the 13th century. In the 19th century, a butcher in Vienna added beef to the sausage mixture, giving rise to the wiener-frankfurter. The recipe soon followed Central European migration to the United States, and the Chicago-based David Berg sausage company was producing frankfurters out of machine-shredded meat scraps as early as 1860. The Oscar Mayer meats company famed for its national hot dog distribution was established in Chicago in 1884, though they initially focused only on selling traditional German sausages like bockwurst, liverwurst and weißwurst.

Many Chicagoans had their first taste of the Viennese-Frankfurter when Austro-Hungarian Jewish immigrants Emil Reichel and Sam Ladany, who had arrived from Vienna just a few years earlier, set up an "Austrian Village" stand to sell kosher all-beef frankfurters with onions and mustard at the famed 1893 World's Fair. The pair went on to establish the Vienna Beef company on Chicago's West Side the following year, and to this day, Vienna Beef frankfurters are considered one of the only frankfurters that are acceptable to include in a proper Chicago dog. One of the leading alternative brands, Red Hot Chicago [not to be confused with Chicago red hots, the unbranded style of frankfurter on which the company was based], was created by Ladany's grandson in 1986 and then purchased by Vienna Beef in 2012.

The younger Ladany once remarked that the Chicago-style hot dog was originally known as the "kosher-style" dog, and that it transitioned over time to the "Chicago-style" moniker. This adherence to kosher guidelines helped set apart the Chicago dog from rising regional variations like the New York hot dog, and most today do not consider a hot dog to be Chicago-style if the meat is not 100% beef. By 1900, eighty percent of all beef in the United States was being slaughtered and processed in the Union Stock Yards on Chicago's South Side, setting the expectation that beef, ideally in a natural casing, was the only suitable meat for a Chicago dog.

Heinz Tomato Catsup, which had first been manufactured in 1876, began to see a contemporaneous rise in prominence following the debut of its iconic octagonal glass bottle at its enormously popular pavilion in Chicago's 1893 World's Fair. But with its pungent, spice-heavy, and sometimes sugary flavor profile, ketchup (as it was later known) quickly came to be seen as a way to mask the flavors of low-quality foods. H. J. Heinz furthermore had to work to overcome a series of food safety scandals surrounding ketchup canneries and bottlers, going so far as to lobby for regulations on his own industry.

At the same time, Chicago's beef industry faced similar controversy with the 1906 publication of Upton Sinclair's invective novel The Jungle, which was filled with accounts of deplorable hygienic conditions at Chicago's Union Stock Yards. The popularity of the hot dog suffered with Sinclair's shocking assertions on sausage production:

There was never the least attention paid to what was cut up for sausage; there would come all the way back from Europe old sausage that had been rejected, and that was moldy and white--it would be dosed with borax and glycerine, and dumped into the hoppers, and made over again for home consumption. There would be meat that had tumbled out on the floor, in the dirt and sawdust, where the workers had tramped and spit uncounted billions of consumption germs. There would be meat stored in great piles in rooms; and the water from leaky roofs would drip over it, and thousands of rats would race about on it...the man who did the shoveling would not trouble to lift out a rat even when he saw one-- there were things that went into the sausage in comparison with which a poisoned rat was a tidbit.

— The Jungle, Chapter 14

Even so, hot dogs remained an ubiquitous street food whose portability made them ideal for events like fairs, street markets, and baseball games. There are few definitive accounts of when Chicago's first "ballpark dog" was served, but the National Baseball Hall of Fame and Museum theorizes that they were first sold either at New York City's Polo Grounds in the 1880s or at St. Louis' Sportsman's Park in the 1890s. Hot dog vendors undoubtedly would have been among the many informal street carts that gathered outside of Chicago Cubs and Chicago White Sox games in the early 20th century, as was common practice at the time. Chicago's oldest sausage manufacturer and distributor, the David Berg company, claimed to have baseball fans among its clients as early as 1901 - likely as the supplier of these carts. German-American restaurateur and Chicago Cubs owner Charles Weeghman introduced the first permanent and official ballpark concession stand behind the Wrigley Field (then Weeghman Park) grandstand in 1914, with hot dogs, popcorn, and peanuts among the stand's offerings.

=== The "dragged through the garden" depression dog ===
The toppings that constitute the modern Chicago-style hot dog came together during the Great Depression at vegetable carts along Maxwell Street on Chicago's Near West Side. One of the Chicago dog's purported inventors, Abe "Fluky" Drexler, sold a five-cent "Depression Dog" special that contained lettuce, tomato, onions, unspecified peppers, mustard, and relish, plus an included side of french fries. Celery salt was introduced as the result of existence of many local celery farms, with Lake View being a celery farming area up until the 1920s and Lincoln Square calling itself the "celery capital of the world" at the time. This proliferation of a hot dog "with a salad on top" came to symbolize abundance and an affordable full meal at an austere time where fresh produce and more expensive whole cuts of meat were rapidly becoming luxuries that few could regularly afford.

The rejection of ketchup and imposition of a beef-only standard also arose from competition among Maxwell Street's hot dog carts to create the most bountiful and high-quality hot dog sandwich. With public concerns about meat quality driven in part by Upton Sinclair's novel, vendors could distinguish their frankfurters as being of the highest quality by claiming they refused to 'cover' any spoilage with ketchup. A commitment to all-beef hot dogs furthermore functioned as a source of local pride in Chicago's embattled meatpacking industry. The pork, turkey, and chicken included in hot dogs outside Chicago were and are still seen as lesser meats due to their lower costs and higher fat and cartilage content. And whereas Chicagoans received the freshest beef prepared locally in the South Side's Union Stockyards, other cities importing Chicago's beef had to contend with refrigeration technology still being in its early stages of development. Ketchup could thus be dismissed as a condiment better suited to accompanying lesser beef that had aged on its journey to destinations outside Chicago.

The toppings of the Chicago-style hot dog have furthermore been heavily influenced by the Near West Side's history as an immigration gateway. Sport peppers first gained notoriety in Chicago via the Mexican pavilion at the 1893 World's Fair, while the neon green relish may have first started out as English piccalilli - itself a derivative of Indian achar. Jewish bakeries had introduced Chicagoans to poppy seed breads, while the home gardens of Italian immigrants likely supplied tomatoes and other fresh vegetables to Maxwell Street's vendors. The neighborhood's numerous Central European immigrants meanwhile established and drove a large market for all kinds of sausage sandwiches, including the celebrated Maxwell Street Polish as just one alternative to the depression dog.

=== The modern Chicago dog ===
As the United States emerged from the Depression into post-World War II abundance, Chicago's food industry saw an easing of cultural expectations in line with a growing national acceptance of processed foods. It was around this time that the modern 'Chicago red hot' was born - a non-Vienna Beef (and sometimes non-beef altogether) variation on the Chicago-style frankfurter that often used artificial food colorings, including the carcinogenic Red 40, to give the frankfurter a brilliant fluorescent red color.

Though never promoted or recognized as "Chicago style", the massive national success of the Chicago-born Oscar Mayer Wiener normalized deviation from the "kosher-style" standard even inside Chicago. Starting around 1929, Oscar Mayer had begun producing a skinless hot dog made by stuffing mechanically-separated mixtures of turkey, pork, beef, veal, and/or chicken trimmings inside of an inedible plant cellulose casing and cooking it until the ground meats congealed into a self-supporting structure that could then be removed from the casing. The hot dog achieved runaway success by mid-century due to innovative advertising campaigns like the Oscar Mayer Wienermobile and the "I wish I were an Oscar Mayer Wiener" jingle.

The success of the Chicago red hot may have driven an effort by Vienna Beef to recover some of the "casing snap" texture and bright natural redness its franks lost after moving to a new hot dog production facility in 1972. Though the issue went unaddressed for over a decade, increasing corporate standards and consumer expectations would eventually bring about a new 'warming room' to replace a warming process that had once unwittingly occurred during transportation between the distant stuffing and smoking areas of Vienna Beef's original hot dog factory.

By the 1980s, Vienna Beef was looking to solidify its place as the undisputed sausage king of Chicago, and it undertook a marketing campaign to re-establish and equate itself with the kosher-style standards of the early 20th century. Former warehouse worker Jim Bodman purchased the company in 1983 and began to focus the company's messaging on its nostalgic meaning to Chicagoans. This included actions like standing tall by the "no ketchup" rule and promoting strong ties with Chicago's beloved sports franchises. As Vienna Beef expanded, it bought out many of its legacy competitors, including David Berg in 1992. At the same time, the company nationally expanded its manufacturing footprint into other meats and many other "Chicago-style" mainstays like Italian beef and neon green relish, and those products now comprise more than sixty percent of Vienna Beef's revenues.

Where Vienna Beef could not either expand or push out competition, it built partnerships. They began aggressive direct-to-vendor marketing until they became the exclusive supplier of the overwhelming majority of Chicago hot dog stands, and loyal vendors who follow the company's quality and recipe standards have been inducted into its "hot dog hall of fame" since 2006. Vienna Beef aided the success of the S. Rosen's poppy seed bun, which has appeared in its marketing materials since the 1980s. In 2005, the pair concocted a marketing scheme to address a long-standing issue of mismatched quantities of buns and wieners in supermarket food packaging, creating a "piece treaty" to match 8 buns to 8 wieners per package. Most importantly, Vienna Beef continually published and promoted what is now considered the "official" recipe for a Chicago-style hot dog: Vienna Beef, a poppy seed bun, and a set of toppings it cheekily deemed the "Chicago Seven": mustard, neon relish, tomato, onion, a pickle spear, sport peppers, and celery salt.

=== The "wiener wars" ===
The central importance of beefs to Chicago's hot dog industry was exemplified by two events of the late 2000s and early 2010s that each separately came to be known as "wiener wars." These 'wars' began with a 2009 lawsuit filed by Chicagoland food manufacturer Sara Lee - the owner of the beef-only Ball Park hot dog brand - against Kraft Foods, which at this point owned the Oscar Mayer brand. Sara Lee contended, among other accusations, that Kraft had engaged in false advertising with "100% pure beef" labeling on some of its Oscar Mayer Wiener products. Kraft's vigorous defense of its 100% beef claims showed that even Oscar Mayer could not overcome negative public perceptions toward the inclusion of "mysterious meats" (as Kraft put it) in hot dogs.

The second major battle of the wiener war was pursued by Vienna Beef against Scott D. Ladany, the grandson of their co-founder. Soon after Bodman had forced a leveraged buyout of the Vienna Beef company, Ladany left the company. Three years later in 1986, at the expiration of his non-compete agreement, Ladany founded what became Vienna Beef's top competitor - Red Hot Chicago. But by 2011, Vienna Beef believed that Ladany had stolen their recipes and branding, or at least told vendors he had done so, and they took him to court. As a condition of the lawsuit's dismissal, Ladany agreed to allow Vienna Beef to acquire his company. He was hired as the executive of Vienna Beef's Red Hot Chicago division, whose frankfurters are still marketed under the separate name.

== Variations ==
The "dragged through the garden" style is heavily promoted by Vienna Beef and Red Hot Chicago, the two most prominent Chicago hot dog manufacturers. But exceptions are common, and often hearken back to the more flexible days of the Depression Dog, when vendors used whatever vegetables they had available and cut costs wherever they could. Some vendors add cucumber slices or lettuce (as was once common on Maxwell Street), omit poppy seeds or celery salt, or substitute in plain relish or a skinless hot dog. The historic Superdawg drive-in chain refers to their relish as piccalilli and notably drops the tomato slices/wedges for a single pickled green tomato wedge on the side.

Several popular hot dog stands such as Jimmy's Red Hots in Humboldt Park serve a simplified version of the Chicago dog known as the "Depression Dog": a steamed natural-casing dog that omits the tomato and sometimes the pickle spear, and in the fashion of Fluky Drexler's original depression dog, comes wrapped up with at least a few french fries.

Many vendors offer a Chicago-style dog with added cheese sauce, known as a cheese-dog.

== Preparation ==
Chicago-style hot dogs are cooked in hot water or steamed before adding the toppings. Purists insist that the cooking temperature must be carefully moderated when doing so - a proper Chicago dog is quickly "water bathed" in simmering water just below boiling temperature, never thrown into a pot of boiling water.

A less common and sometimes-controversial version is cooked on a charcoal grill and then referred to as a "char-dog". Char-dogs are easily identifiable because very often the ends of the dog are sliced in crisscross fashion before cooking, producing a distinctive cervelat-style "curled-x" shape as the dog cooks.

The typical beef hot dog weighs 1/8 pound (2.0 oz; 57 g), and the most traditional type features a natural casing, providing a distinctive "snap" when bitten. The Chicago dog cannot be made with non-beef hot dogs, and many do not consider it to be a Chicago dog if it is not made specifically with Vienna Beef or an all-beef Chicago red hot. These manufacturers, which make both skinless and natural casing varieties, take Chicago's beef-centered orthodoxy a step further by ensuring that all of their hot dogs are made from 75% bull's meat, which increases the frankfurter's ratio of protein to fat. The skinless frankfurter is considered a budget or children's variety, while natural casing frankfurters are sold at a slightly higher premium.

Vienna Beef incorporates a closely-guarded proprietary blend of spices, over which it has sued competitors including Red Hot Chicago. Its traditional natural casing hot dogs are stuffed into either pig or lamb's intestines, whereas cheaper skinless hot dogs (both theirs and others) are typically stuffed into an inedible paper-based cellulose wrapping. Vienna Beef sausages are warmed for approximately one-half hour prior to being smoked and cooked, and skinless hot dogs must additionally be stripped of their cellulose casing before packaging.

A proper Chicago dog will include a high-gluten bun made to hold up to steam warming - typically the S. Rosen's Mary Ann brand poppy seed bun made by Alpha Baking Company.

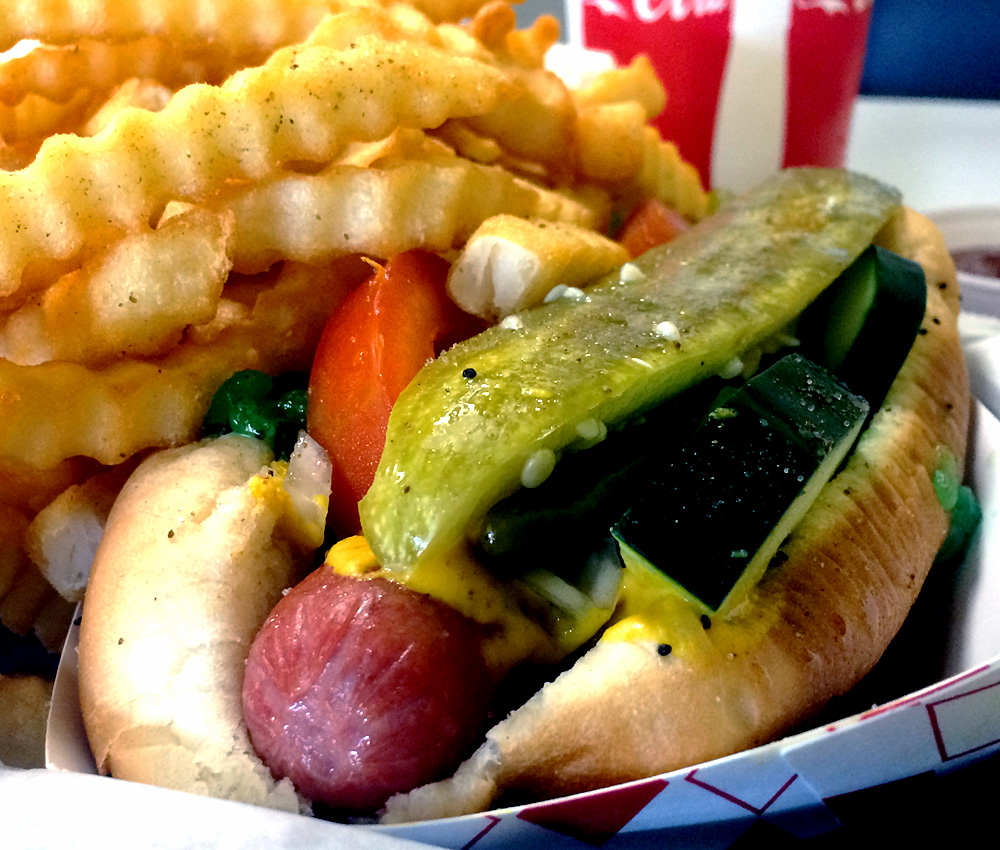
Chicago-style hot dog, made by Johnniebeefs restaurant in Salt Lake City, Utah, US

The traditional "neon-green" relish is prepared by simply adding blue food coloring to sweet pickle relish until the natural yellow hue turns to a deep green.

== Restaurants ==
The Chicago area has more hot dog restaurants than McDonald's, Wendy's, and Burger King restaurants combined. A typical Chicago hot dog stand often serves many other local staples, including the Maxwell Street Polish, gyros, pork chop and Italian beef sandwiches, corn dogs, tamales, pizza puffs and Italian ice. The restaurants often have unique names or architectural features. These restaurants often act as the front-line enforcers of Chicago's changing hot dog standards, setting policies on the use of ketchup or the acceptability of char dogs.

=== Popular and historic vendors ===
- Fluky's
- Gene & Jude's
- Hot Doug's (closed)
- Portillo's
- Superdawg
- Redhot Ranch
- The Wieners Circle
- Woody's Chicago Style

== See also ==
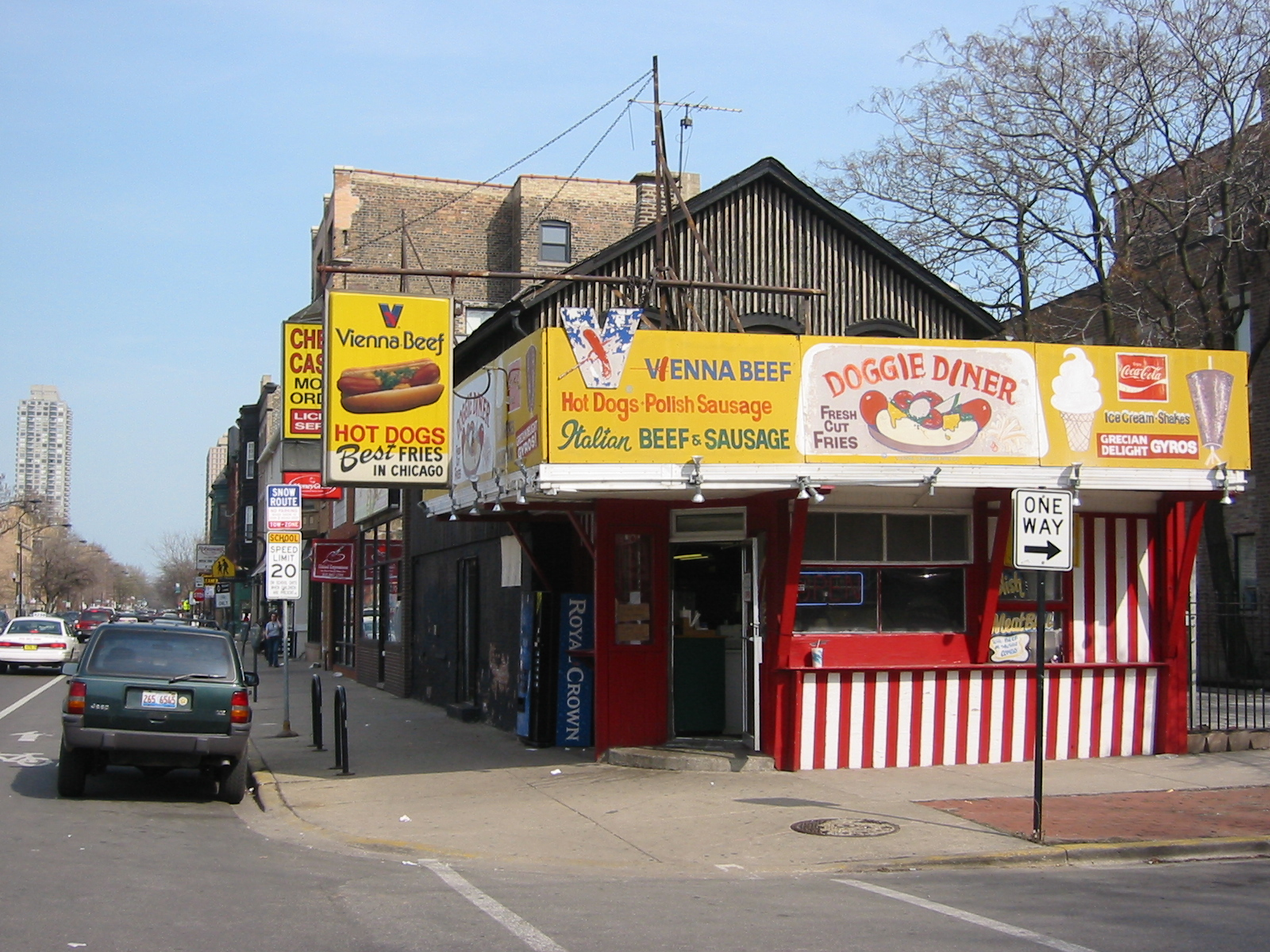
Hot dog establishment in Chicago in 2003

- Chicago-style pizza
- Coney Island hot dog
- Cuisine of Chicago
- Francheezie
- Hot dog variations
- Italian Beef
- List of hot dogs
- Maxwell Street Polish
