= The Wieners Circle =

Hot dog stand in Chicago

Coordinates: 41°55′49″N 87°38′37″W

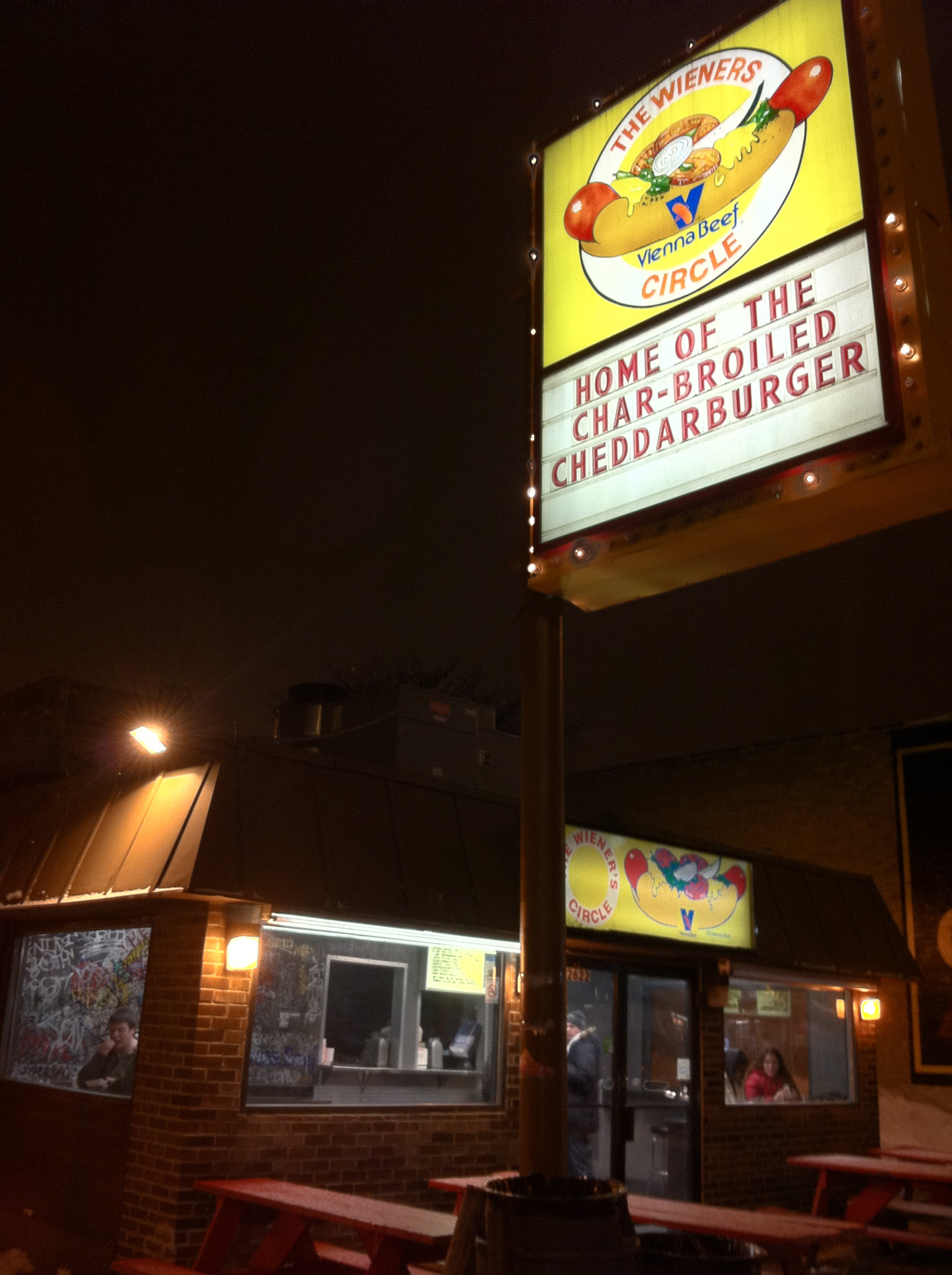
- The Wieners Circle on North Clark in the Lincoln Park neighborhood of Chicago
- Interactive map of The Wieners Circle

Restaurant information
- Established: 1983
- Owners: Ari Levy; Matt Brewer
- Food type: Hot dog stand
- Location: Lincoln Park, Chicago, Illinois, United States
- Reservations: No

The Wieners Circle is a hot dog stand on Clark Street in the Lincoln Park neighborhood of Chicago, Illinois, United States. It is known for its Maxwell Street Polish, char-dogs, hamburgers, cheese fries, and the mutual verbal abuse between the employees and the customers during the late-weekend hours.

The opening of two new Las Vegas based The Weiner Circle franchises were announced in 2014.

== Food ==
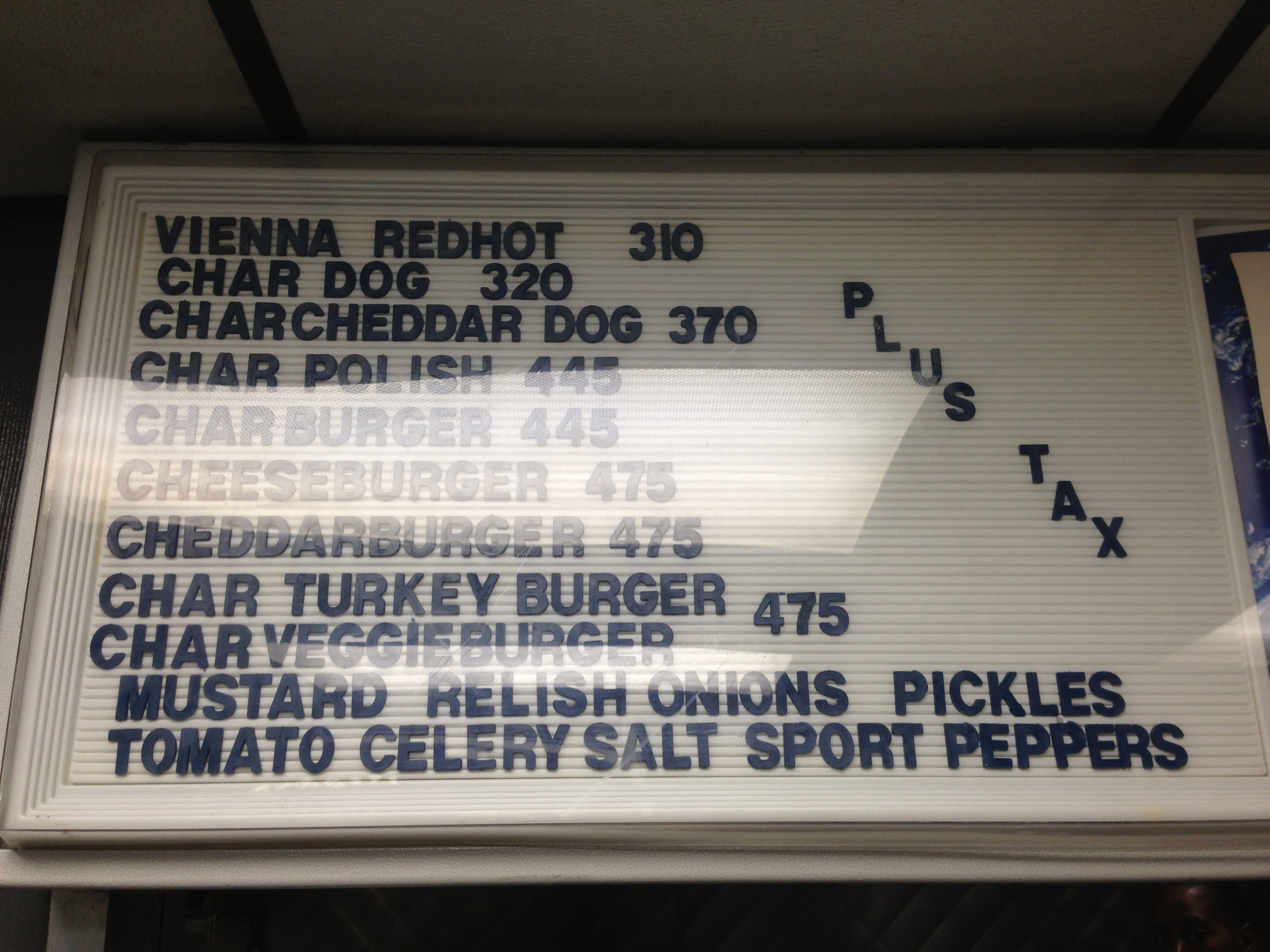
Menu prices in 2013

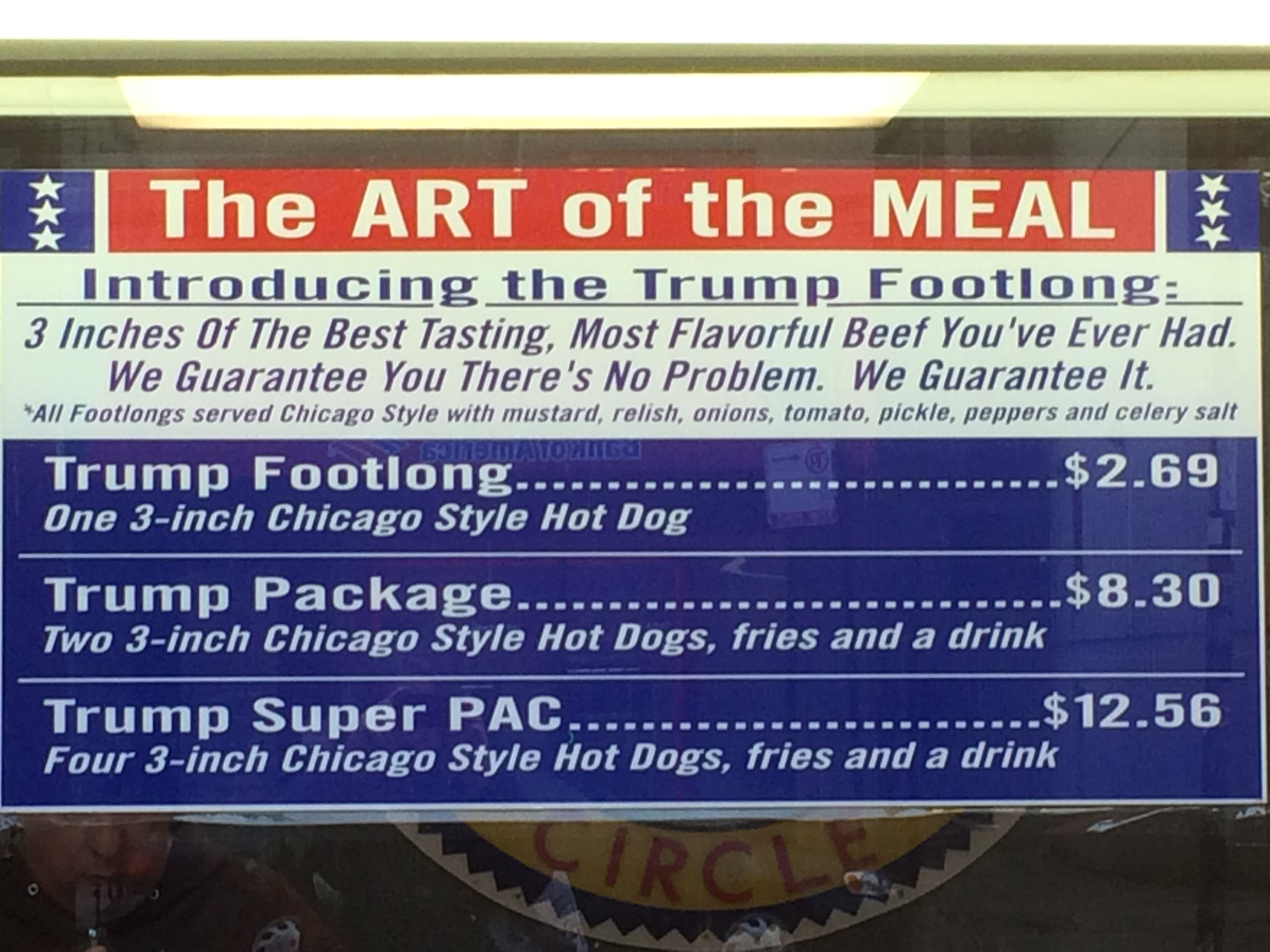
'Trump Footlong' on the menu in 2016

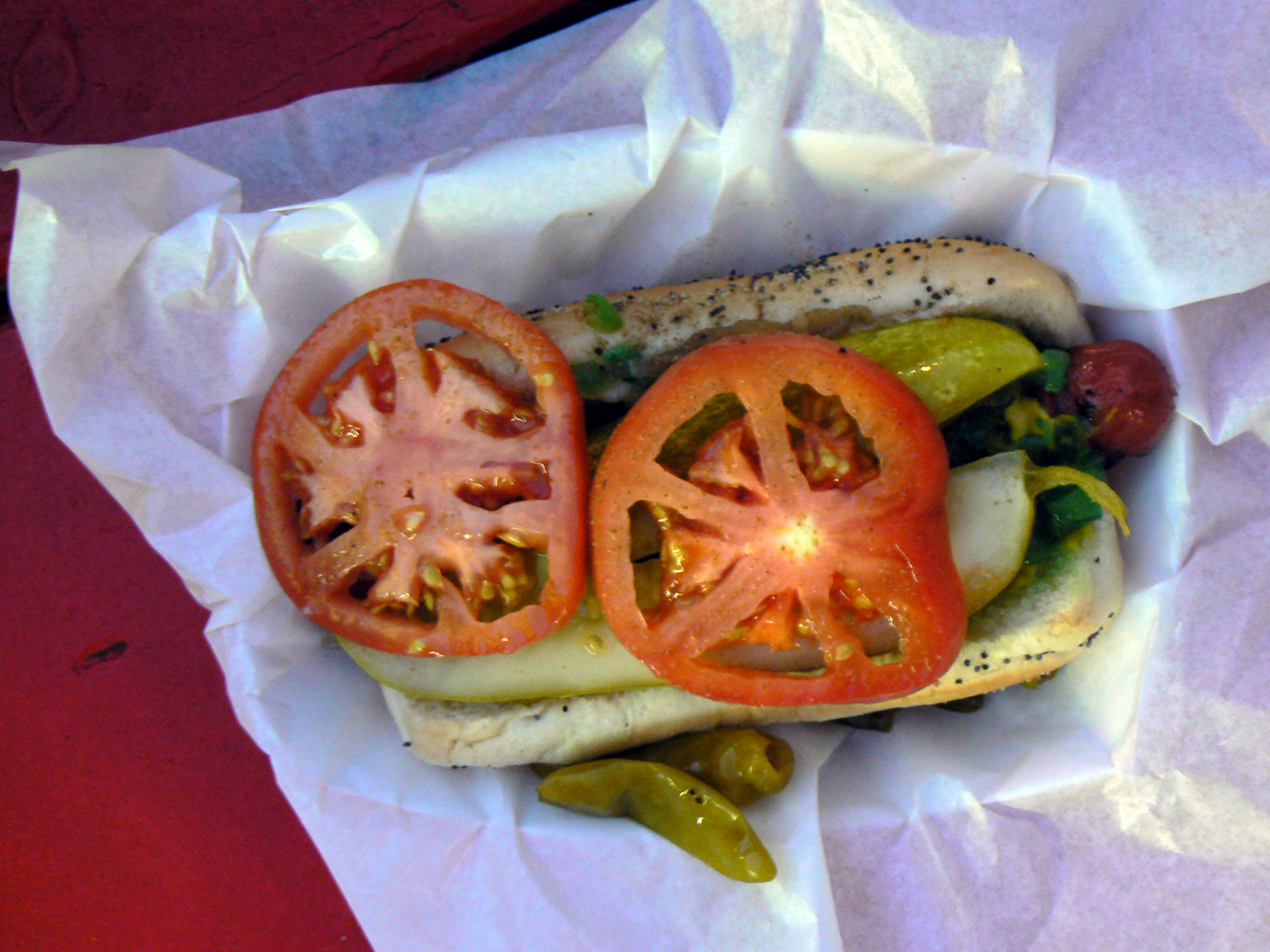
A Wieners Circle hot dog with "the works"

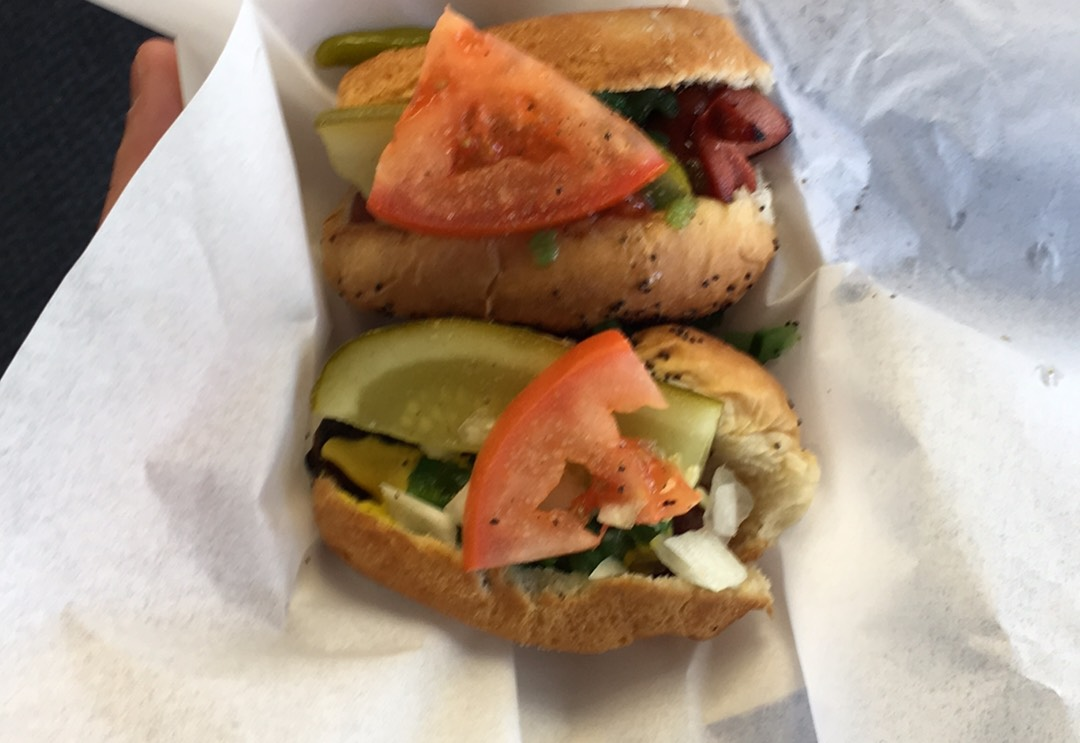
Two Trump Footlongs

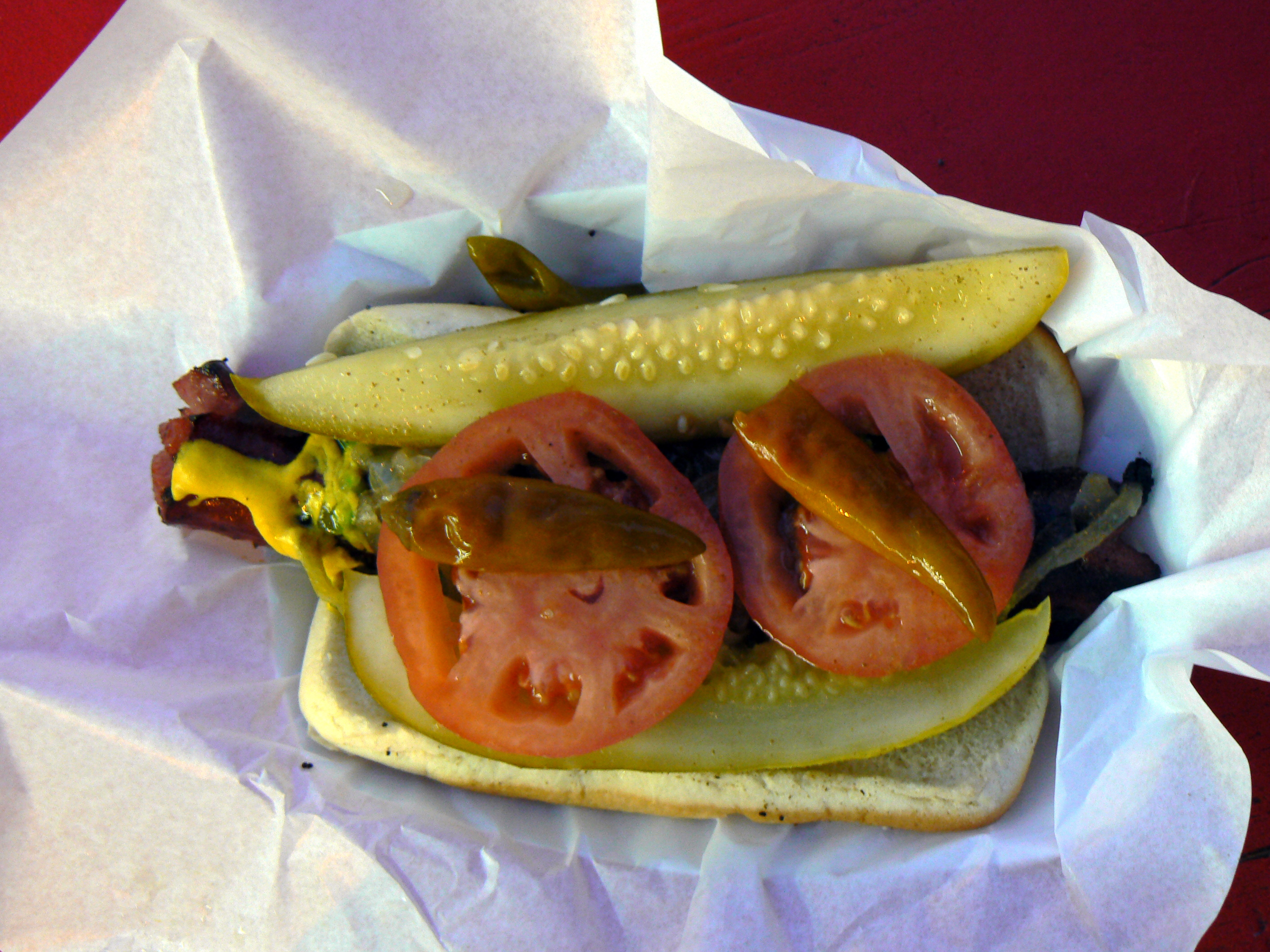
Polish char dog

The establishment is known for its char-grilled food, especially its hot dogs and hamburgers (commonly called char-dogs and char-burgers). A Wieners Circle char dog with "the works" is a grilled Vienna Beef hot dog on a warm poppy seed bun, topped with mustard, onions, relish, dill pickle spears, tomato slices, sport peppers and a dash of celery salt.

== History ==
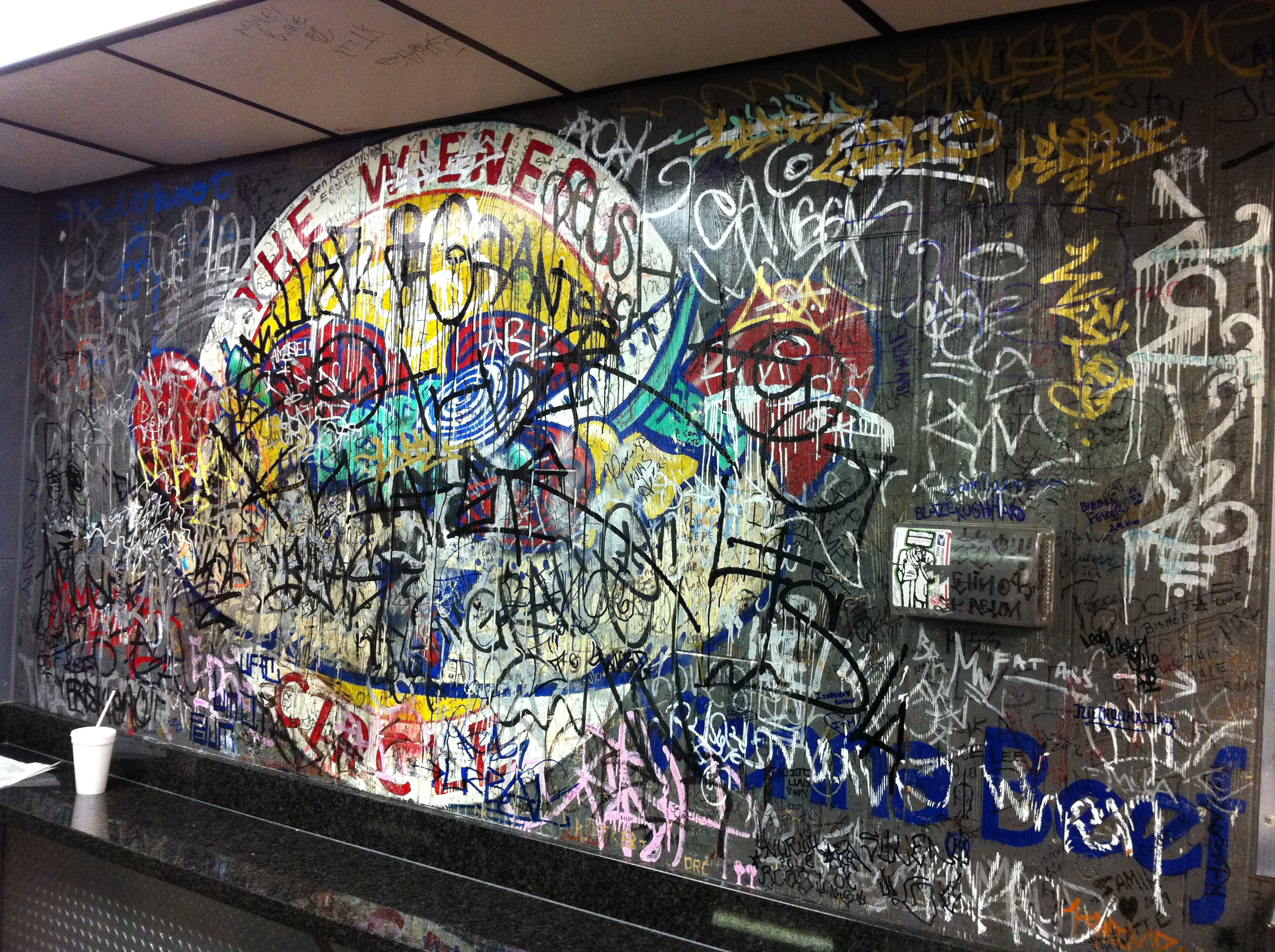
The interior of the establishment, covered in graffiti (photographed in 2011)

The Wieners Circle opened for business in 1983, replacing a Chicago-style hot dog restaurant in the same location called Harry-O's. Sometime in the early 1990s (circa 1992) Larry Gold, one of the proprietors, called a drunk and distracted customer an "asshole" in order to get his attention. This set off the late-night abuse culture of the restaurant. The atmosphere can range from playful to hostile. While the atmosphere during business hours in the daytime is normal, the language used by both the staff and customers during the late hours is notoriously foul and aggressive. On the weekends, the establishment stays open as late as 5:00 am, drawing many drunken customers who have arrived from bars and clubs.

The nightly tips are very high, and people have worked there for at least ten years. The location of the hot dog stand is just north of what used to be the Wrightwood Hotel. In 2008, the restaurant was briefly closed by health inspectors for not having hot running water where employees would wash their hands, and other food safety violations.

In 2015, Ari Levy and Matt Brewer purchased the establishment.

=== Publicities ===
The establishment has a history of political satire in its signage and advertising. In March 2016, the restaurant offered 3-inch "Trump footlong" hot dogs. In June 2017, they advertised "Paris Accord compliant covfefe". In March 2020, signage mocked the commuting of the sentence of Rod Blagojevich. In 2021, the establishment announced that it intends to serve alcohol when it reopens.

In September 2024, the establishment's Instagram account posted a sign that read "immigrants eat our dogs", referencing the false claims of Haitian immigrants illegally abducting and eating pets in Springfield, Ohio, which had been mentioned by Donald Trump during his first presidential debate with Kamala Harris. Following Chicago native Cardinal Robert Prevost's election as the first American pope and taking the papal name Pope Leo XIV in the 2025 conclave, it displayed the Latin phrase CANES NOSTROS IPSE COMEDIT ("He has eaten our [hot] dogs") in homage.

== In media ==
One of the more famous employees is Roberta "Poochie" Jackson, who was featured (along with the restaurant) in a 2007 episode of Showtime's television version of the Chicago Public Radio program This American Life, as well as an episode of Extreme Fast Food on the Travel Channel. In Chicago travel guides, The Wieners Circle is often extolled as a source for authentic Chicago-style hot dogs and its uniquely abrasive customer relations.

The restaurant was featured in an episode of Insomniac with Dave Attell on Comedy Central in 2002 (Season 2, Episode 1).

The restaurant is the setting for a truTV reality show, The Weiner's Circle.

The Wieners Circle was featured in both radio and TV episodes of This American Life.

The restaurant was the setting of a sketch featuring Jack McBrayer and Triumph the Insult Comic Dog in the June 14, 2012 episode of the late night talk show Conan, which was the last in a week of shows taped in Chicago.

In the "Going Deep" episode of The Great Indoors Jack takes Eddie there to cheer him up after his divorce, only to have staffer Valerie (played by Poochie Jackson herself) unwittingly razz Eddie about his divorce. Jack later sends Clark and Emma there as a prank, as they don't understand that the insults are part of the experience.

In April 2020, during the COVID-19 pandemic, the Wieners Circle began producing a YouTube show called Wieners Circle TV.

== See also ==
- Cencio la Parolaccia
- Ceres Cafe
- Ed Debevic's
- Chicago-style hot dog
- Maxwell Street Polish
- Tamale Guy
- Sam Wo
