= Vienna Beef =

Hot dog brand

Vienna Beef Inc.
- Industry: Food
- Founded: 1893
- Headquarters: Chicago, Illinois
- Key people: Jack Bodman (CEO)
- Products: Hot dogs, pickles, various
- Revenue: $130 million
- Website: www.viennabeef.com

Vienna Beef Inc. is the main manufacturer of the hot dog used in the classic Chicago-style hot dog, as well as Polish sausage and Italian beef, delicacies of independent Chicago-style hot dog and beef stands. The company also produces a variety of deli meats, some of which are available at Chicago area supermarkets.

The company's headquarters is at the intersection of Elston, Damen, and Fullerton avenues in the North Center community area, on the Chicago River. The company has been located in Chicago since the Columbian Exposition of 1893. Originally, the factory was in the same building as the headquarters. Vienna Beef relocated its factory from Bucktown to Bridgeport in 2015, where a Factory Store opened the following year. Vienna Beef's revenue for the year 2015 was estimated to be $130 million.

After the Bucktown factory store and cafe closed in 2020, Vienna Beef announced a $20 million redevelopment of the former site in 2023. Construction was continuing in 2024. An August 2026 report said the restaurant and factory-store opening had been delayed until 2027.

== History ==
Emil Reichel and Sam Ladany emigrated from Vienna, in the Austro-Hungarian Empire, to Chicago in the 1890s. During the Columbian Exposition they sold hot dogs to the many visitors of the Exposition. In 1894, Reichel and Ladany opened a storefront on Halsted Avenue on Chicago's West Side. In 1900, Vienna Beef began to sell and deliver to other stores and restaurants in Chicago. During the Great Depression, a number of Vienna Beef vendors begin advertising that their hot dogs have a "salad on top," giving rise to the traditional Chicago-style hot dog. In 1950, Vienna Beef distribution spread to other Midwestern states, and in the 1960s, Vienna Beef began selling in supermarkets.

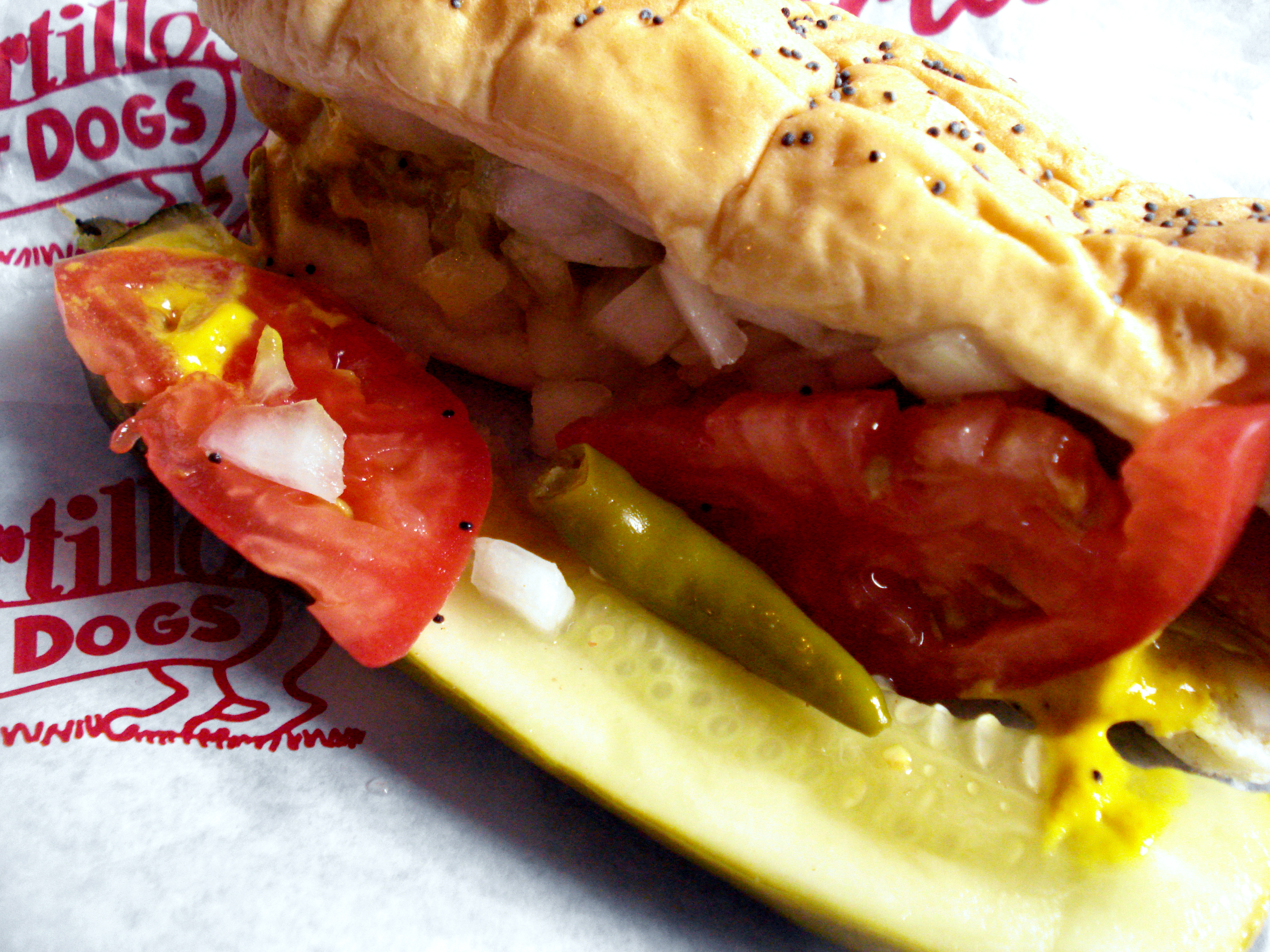
A Chicago-style hot dog at Portillo's

Henry Davis (1904–1974), a one time VP of sales, was instrumental in making Vienna Beef the Chicago hot dog. Davis was honored by Vienna Beef, the City of Chicago and the State of Illinois for his contributions in helping create Chicago's independent hot dog stands. There is a permanent collection of documents, photos and memorabilia in the Chicago Historical Society Archives called the "Henry Davis Collection" that was inaugurated in 1989.
