= Hot dog variations =

Ways to serve the "hot dog" style of sausage from around the world

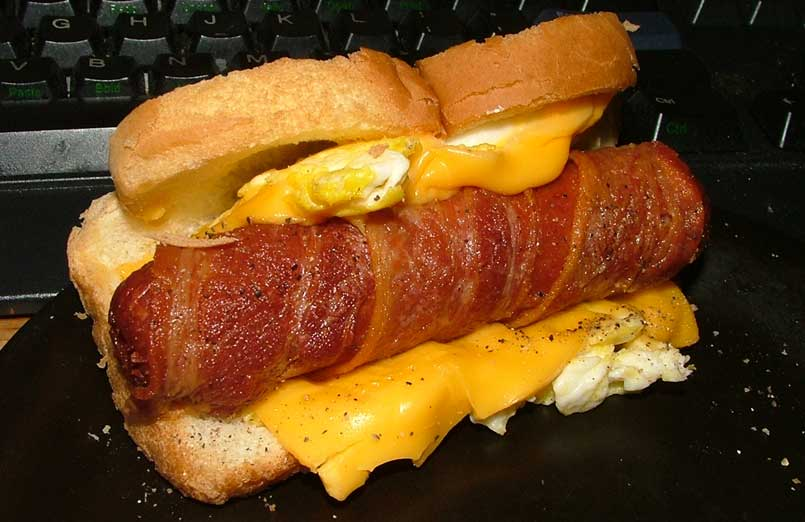
A New Jersey breakfast dog with cheese

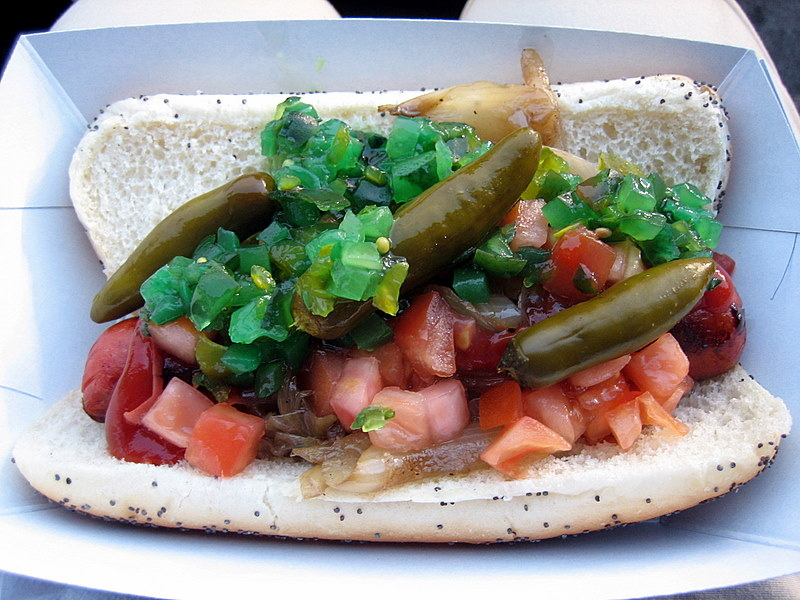
Chicago style hot dog sold at Wrigley Field

Different areas of the world have local variations on the hot dog, in the type of meat used, the condiments added, and its means of preparation.

A hot dog is a type of cooked sausage, traditionally grilled or steamed and served in a partially sliced bun. This type of sausage was culturally imported from Germany and popularized in the United States in the 19th and 20th century, where it became a working-class street food sold at hot dog stands and carts. It is also sold at fast-food restaurants and convenience stores, as well as being available for home preparation after being purchased at grocery stores. The hot dog became closely associated with cookouts, and sporting events such as baseball and American culture. It has become a popular street food and concessions stand menu item globally, besides from home preparation. There are many variations in topping and styles; in many cases a certain style becomes popular in a certain region, and in particular there is variation in the toppings, preparation, and type of sausage and bun.

== United States ==
Hot dogs are a very popular sandwich throughout the United States. Many regional variations exist.

=== Alaska ===
Hot dogs made with caribou meat added are sold as "reindeer dogs" throughout Alaska.

=== Arizona ===
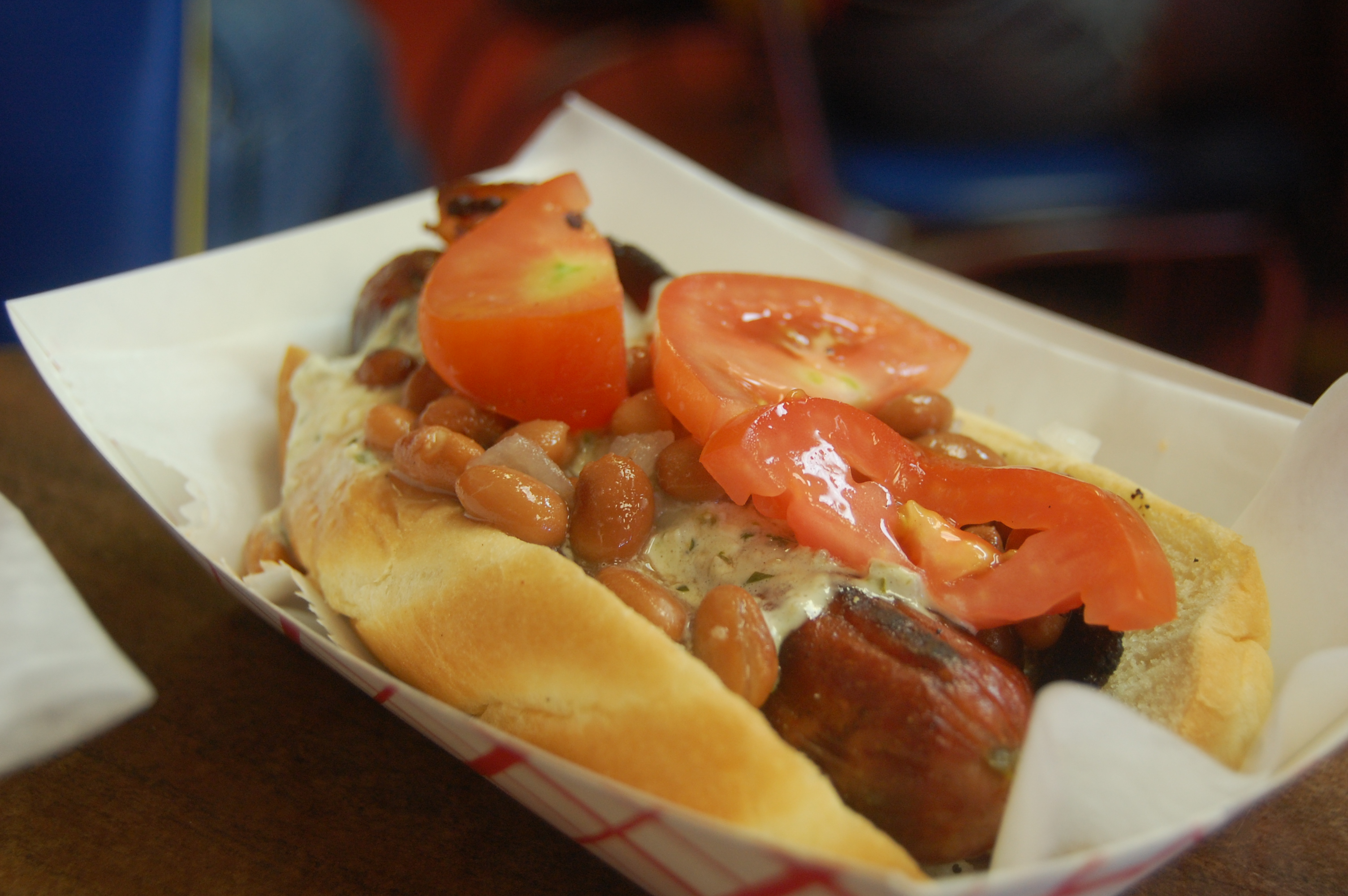
A Sonoran hot dog, topped with pinto beans, tomatoes, and melted cheese

The Sonoran hot dog is popular in Tucson, Phoenix, and elsewhere in southern Arizona, as well as in the neighboring Mexican state of Sonora, where it originated.

=== Arkansas ===
The Sooie Dog, topped with bacon and barbecue sauce, or the Frito Pie dog, with queso (also known as cheese dip), Fritos, chili, and a small amount of celery salt.

=== California ===
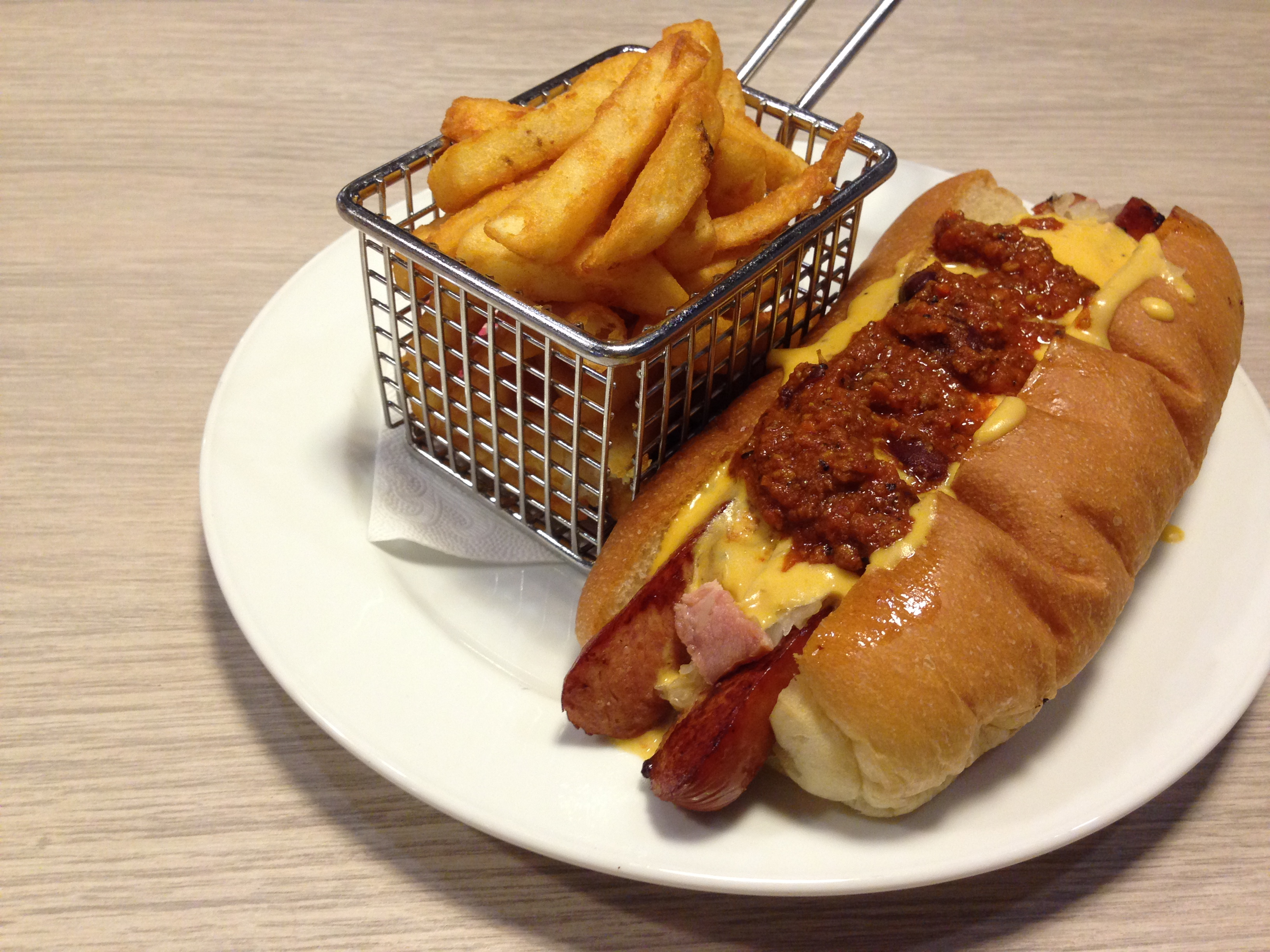
A chili dog with fries

In Los Angeles, Pink's Hot Dogs promotes its celebrity customers and its chili dogs, the latter of which come in a wide number of varieties. A local chain, Tommy's, also has chili dogs featuring a premium natural casing hot dog alongside its much better-known chili hamburgers, and another local chain The Hat, which specializes in pastrami, has them also.

Other notable Los Angeles chains that specialize in hot dogs include Hot Dog On A Stick, which serves a preparation similar to a corn dog, and Wienerschnitzel, a chain that bills itself as "The World's Largest Hot Dog Chain." The Farmer John Dodger Dog is sold at Dodger Stadium.

Numerous street vendors in Los Angeles and San Francisco serve the "Downtown Dog" or "LA Street Dog" a Mexican-style bacon-wrapped hot dog with grilled onions, jalapeños, and bell peppers, and mustard, ketchup, and mayonnaise as condiments. These are typically sold near attractions like Fisherman's Wharf or around closing time outside nightclubs and bars by immigrant Central-American vendors, who grill the hot dogs on small push-carts. The legality of such operations may be questionable, leading locals to sometimes refer to these treats as "Danger Dogs". Legislation in 2018 (SB 946) and 2022 (SB 972) decriminalized street-food vending.

=== Connecticut ===
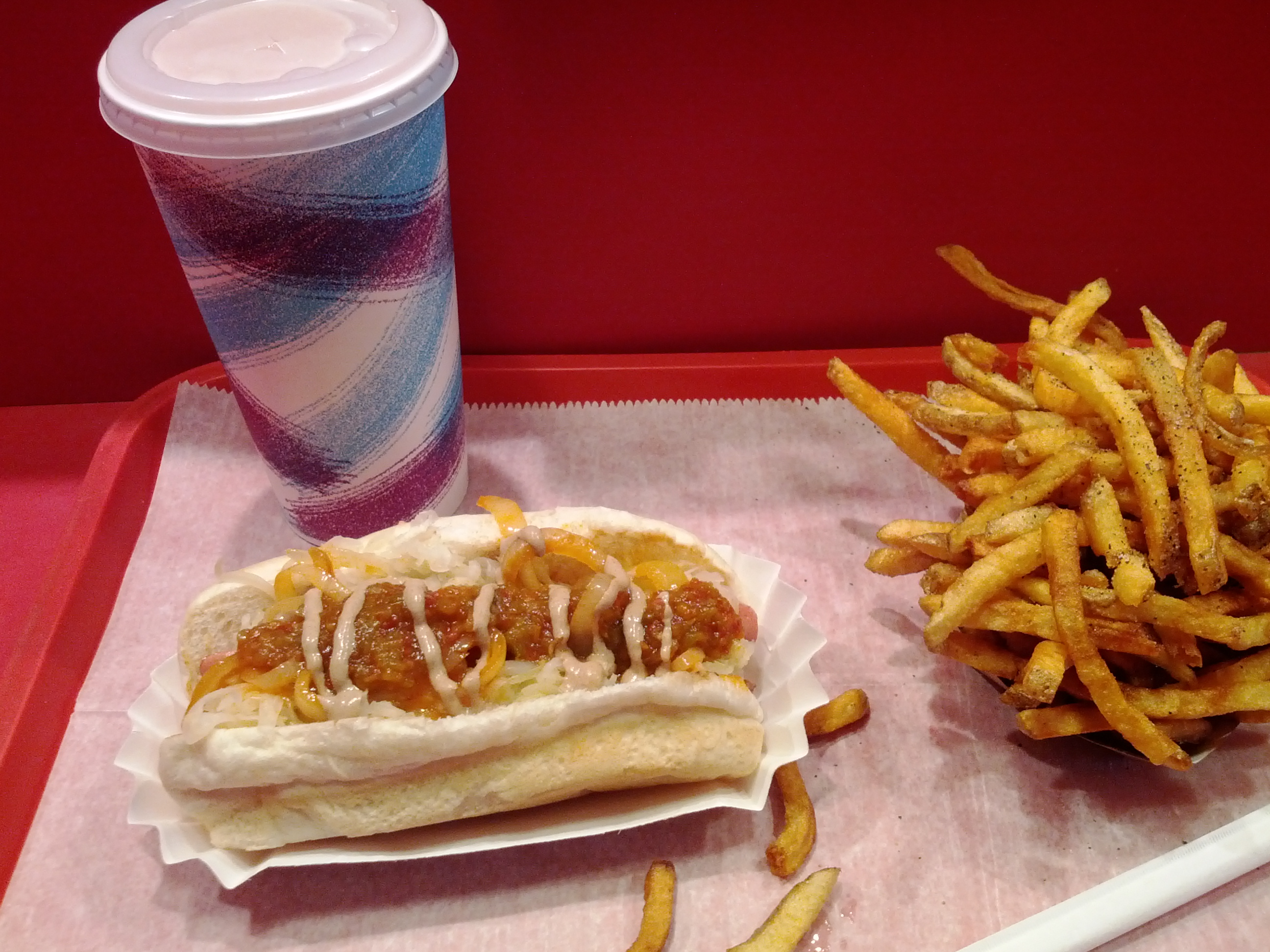
Super Duper Weenie from Fairfield, CT

Connecticut hot dog restaurants often serve sausages produced by local family operations such as Hummel Bros, Martin Rosol, or Grote & Weigel, with national brands being relatively less common. The hot dogs are typically served on New England rolls. There is otherwise no particular Connecticut style though deep frying and homemade condiments are common.

=== Georgia ===
In Columbus, Georgia, a local favorite is the "scrambled dog," the exemplar of which was first served at the Dinglewood Pharmacy by "The Lieutenant" Charles Stevens over 50 years ago. The scrambled dog is a chopped hot dog covered with chili, onions and pickles with an accompanying portion of oyster crackers.

In Fitzgerald, Georgia, Johnnie's Drive In served the "scrambled dog" beginning in the early 1940s. Johnnie's scrambled dog is two sliced hot dogs over a hot dog bun with mustard and catsup and covered with oyster crackers, chili, cole slaw, and sliced dill pickles.

=== Hawaii ===
Hawaiian-style hot dogs are made with smoky polish sausage served on a toasted Hawaiian sweet bun that has a hole punched out of the middle. The hole or "puka" is filled with tropical fruits and sauces, such as pineapple or mango mustard, and garlic lemon sauce. Puka hot dog stands use a heated rod that pokes the hole in the bun and toasts the inside at the same time. This prevents the inside of the bun from getting soggy from the sauces. The resulting puka dog is sweet, salty, and spicy.

Another popular variety of Hawaiian hot dog is grilled and then served with a relish that includes pineapple, red onion, peppers, lime juice, and either cilantro or parsley. Additional condiments may include mayonnaise mixed with either sriracha or teriyaki sauce.

=== Illinois ===
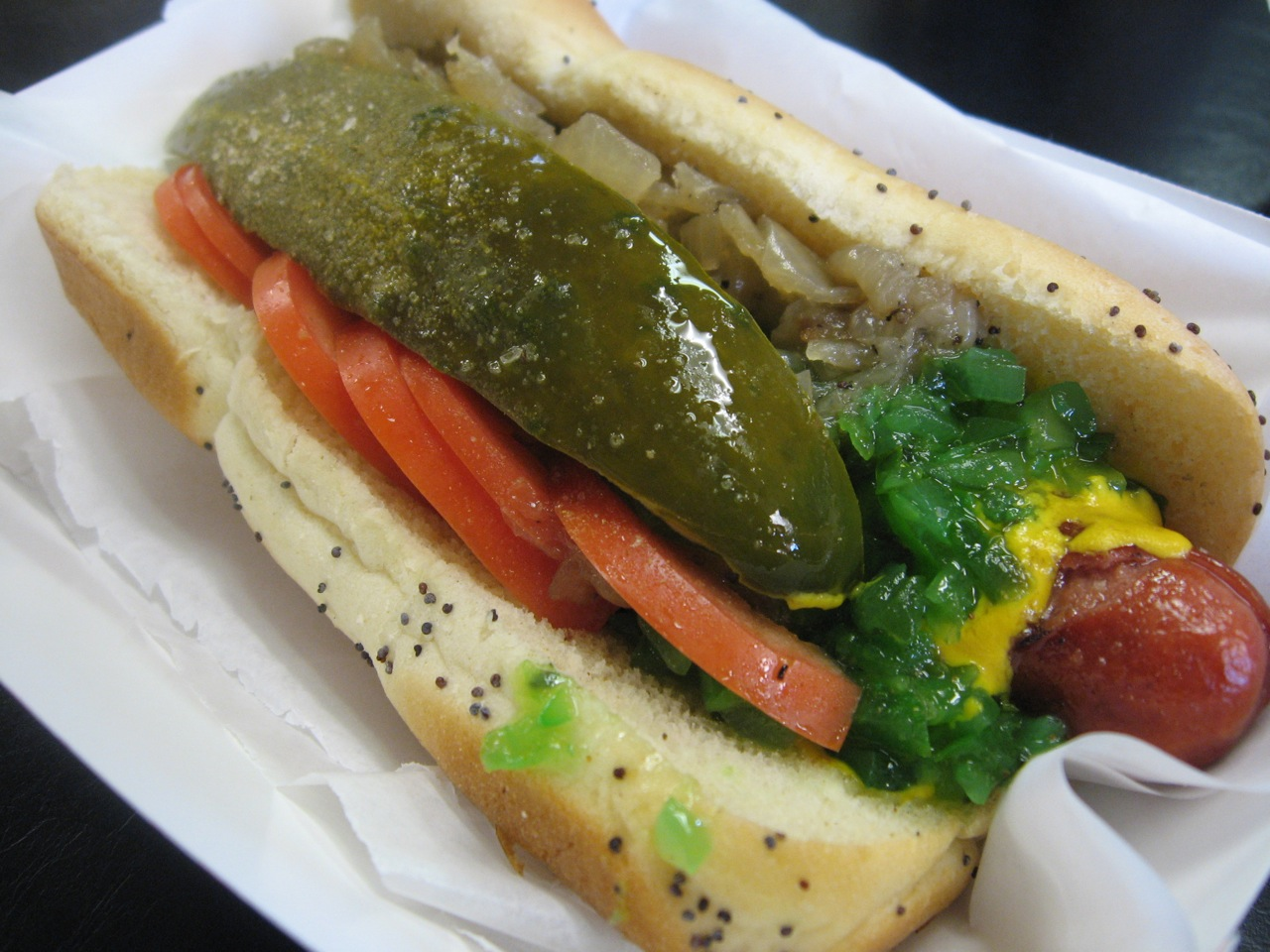
A Chicago-style hot dog

The Chicago-style hot dog is a steamed kosher-style all-beef, natural-casing hot dog on a steamed poppy seed bun, topped with yellow mustard, chopped white onions, a dill pickle spear, tomato slices, Chicago-style relish, hot sport peppers, and a dash of celery salt. Chicago-style hot dogs do not include ketchup.

This "dragged through the garden" style (more commonly called, "with the works"), is heavily promoted by Vienna Beef and Red Hot Chicago, the two most prominent Chicago hot dog manufacturers, but exceptions are common, with vendors adding cucumbers or lettuce, omitting poppy seeds or celery salt, or using plain relish or a skinless hot dog. Several popular hot dog stands serve a simpler version: a steamed natural-casing dog with only mustard, onions, plain relish and sport peppers, wrapped up with hand-cut fries, while the historic Superdawg drive-ins notably substitute a pickled tomato.

=== Kansas and Missouri ===
A Kansas City-style hot dog is a pork sausage in a sesame seed bun topped with brown mustard, sauerkraut and melted Swiss cheese.

=== Maine ===
A popular hot dog in Maine is colored bright red and known as a "red snapper". The idea was brought to the US by a German immigrant, and two companies—W.A. Bean and Rice's—competed in sales. The color tradition has stuck into modern times. Red snappers are typically served in split-top buns.

=== Massachusetts ===
In Boston, hot dogs are often served steamed as opposed to grilled. The Fenway Frank, served at Fenway Park, is a fixture for Red Sox fans, and there are several other local brands such as Pearl that are used. Hot dogs in the Boston area are associated with Boston baked beans, though this is not unique to the region. Ketchup, mustard, relish, picalilli, and chopped onions are the most common toppings.

=== Michigan ===
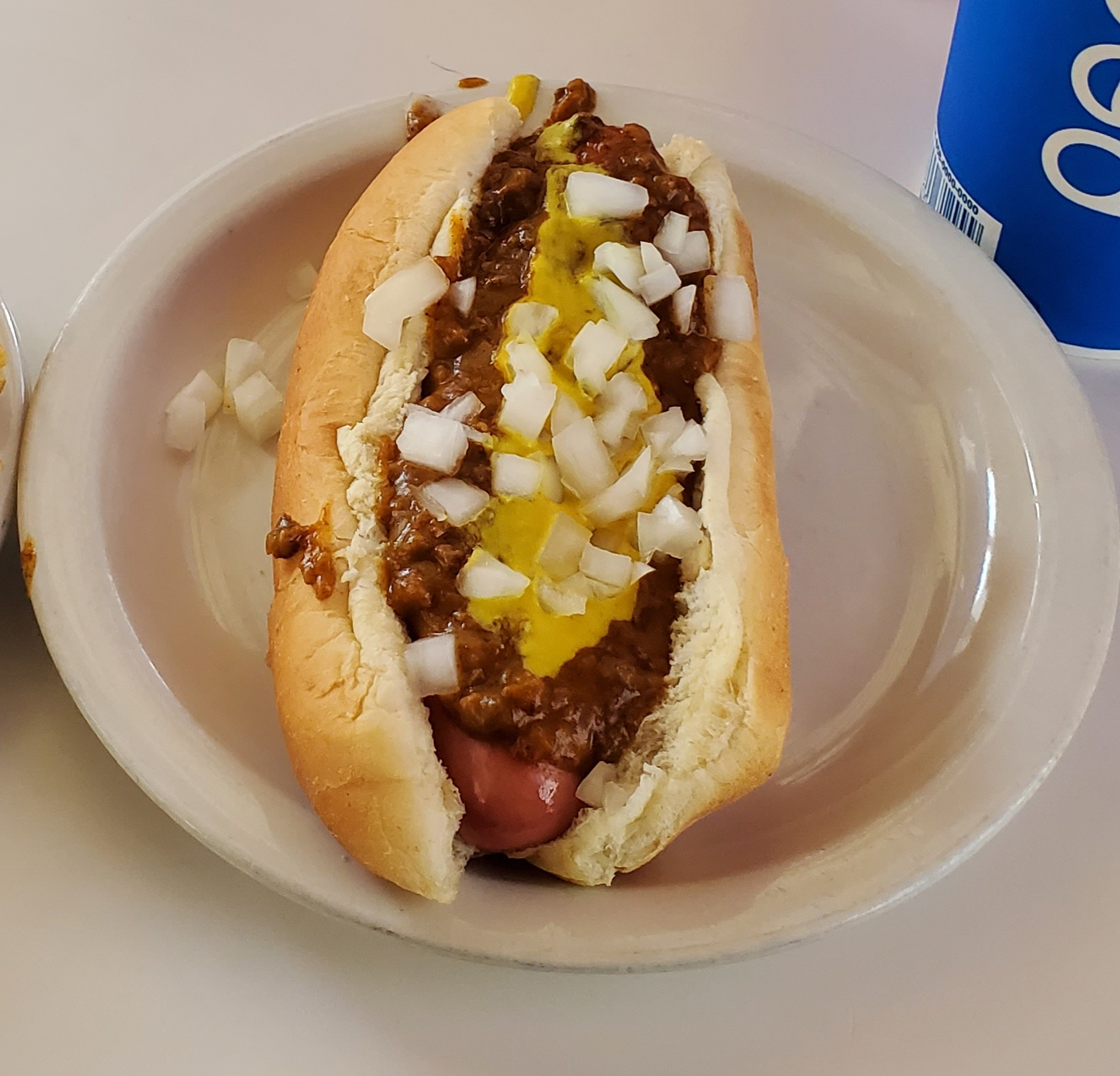
American Coney Island hot dog served in Detroit, Michigan

In southeastern Michigan, restaurants serve what's known as a Coney dog, developed early in the 20th century by Greek immigrants. "Coney joints" are very specific as to the ingredients: a beef or beef and pork European-style Vienna sausage of German origin in a natural lamb or sheep casing, topped with a spiced sauce made with ground beef heart, one or two stripes of yellow mustard and diced or chopped white onions. There are three variations on the Coney dog: Jackson style, which started in 1914 with a ground beef sauce prior to switching to ground beef heart in the early 1940s, Detroit style, first served in 1917 and made with a more soupy beef heart-based sauce, and Flint style, with Flint Coney Island opening in 1924 serving a specially developed Koegel's coney topped with thicker, meatier sauce based on a Macedonian goulash, made almost entirely of a finely ground beef heart blend from Abbott's Meat. With over 350 chain and independent purveyors of these dogs in the metro-Detroit area alone, an entire restaurant industry has developed from the hot dog and are called Coney Islands.

=== New Jersey ===
New Jersey's Italian hot dog includes diced fried potatoes combined with brown mustard served on a spicy hot dog. The most common brands of spicy hot dogs used are Sabrett's or Best's, both of which are NJ companies. A traditional Italian Hot Dog is made by cutting a round "pizza bread" in half (for a double) or into quarters (for a single), cutting a pocket into it and spreading the inside with mustard. A deep-fried dog (or two if it is a double) is put in the pocket, topped with fried (or sautéed) onions and peppers, and then topped off with crisp-fried potato chunks. A variation of this, often found at express takeout restaurants (such as "chicken shacks," Chinese restaurants, pizzerias, etc., and can also be requested at some lunch trucks and luncheonettes across the state) substitutes French fries for the traditional potato round, and in some spots a Portuguese or sub roll replaces the traditional round bread used.

The Texas wiener or Hot Texas wiener was created in Paterson, New Jersey sometime before 1920. A traditional Texas wiener is blanched in cool oil, finished in hot oil, and topped with spicy mustard, chopped onions, and a chili sauce.

=== New York ===
==== New York City ====
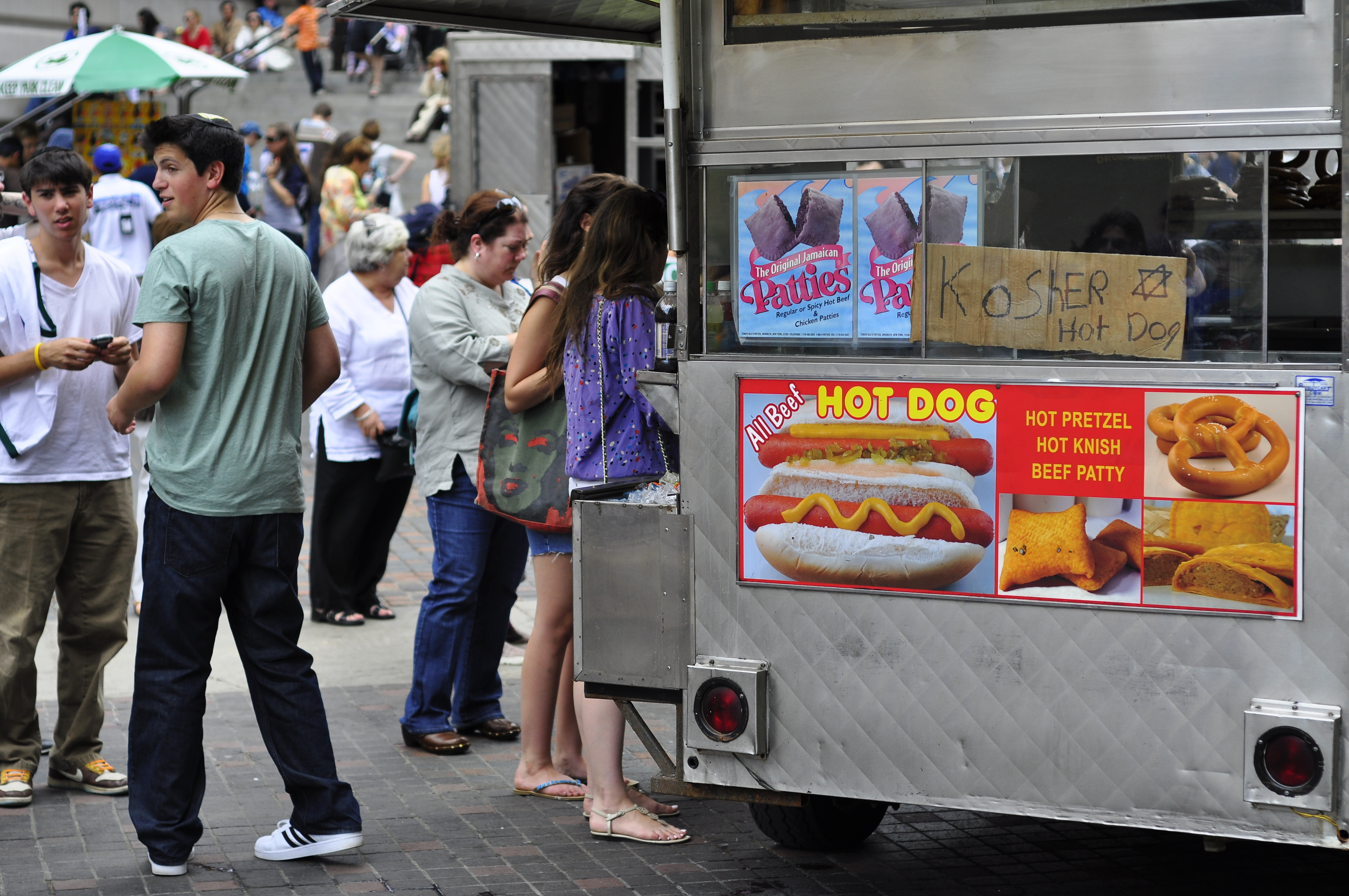
A typical kosher hot dog stand in New York City, with an illustration of hot dogs typical to the area

In New York City, the natural-casing all-beef hot dogs served at Katz's Delicatessen, Gray's Papaya, Papaya King, Papaya Dog and any Sabrett cart are all made by Sabrett's parent company, Marathon Enterprises, Inc. Local kosher brands—which are not permitted natural casings—include Hebrew National, Empire National. The usual condiments are mustard and sauerkraut, with optional sweet onions in a tomato based sauce invented by Alan Geisler, usually made by Sabrett. Hot dogs are available on street corners as well as at delicatessens. New York street vendors generally store their unsold dogs in warm-water baths, giving rise to the semi-affectionate moniker "dirty water dog." Bagel dogs are also sold in Manhattan.

==== Upstate ====
The white hot or "porker" is a variation on the hot dog found mostly in the Rochester area. It is composed of some combination of uncured and unsmoked pork, beef, and veal; it is believed that the lack of smoking or curing allows the meat to retain a naturally white color.

A Michigan hot dog, Michigan red hot, or simply "michigan", is a steamed all-beef hot dog on a steamed bun topped with a meaty sauce, generally referred to as "michigan sauce", and is a specialty in and around Plattsburgh, New York.

In the Capital District surrounding Albany, smaller-than-usual wieners are served with a spicy meat sauce; the Capital District style is quite similar to the New York System or Hot Wieners of Rhode Island. In the mid-twentieth century, hot dog purveyors reportedly would carry the dogs to the table lined up on their bare forearms, giving rise to the term "the Hairy Arm"; today, health codes prohibit this practice. Further north, in three locations in and around Glens Falls, New Way Lunch has served similar hot dogs with meat sauce, mustard, and raw onions for nearly 100 years.

Texas hots have a niche following in western New York. A 2017 article in the Olean Times Herald made note of the dish's disappearance from the city of Olean.

=== North Carolina ===
In North Carolina, hot dogs have a distinct red color and are prepared Carolina style which includes chili, cole slaw and onions; locally, mustard sometimes replaces slaw, or is added as a fourth item. Merritt's Burger House has been serving Carolina hot dogs since 1958.

=== Ohio ===
In Cincinnati, a hot dog topped with Cincinnati chili is called a "coney," and when grated cheddar cheese is added, a "cheese coney." The default coney also includes mustard and diced onion.

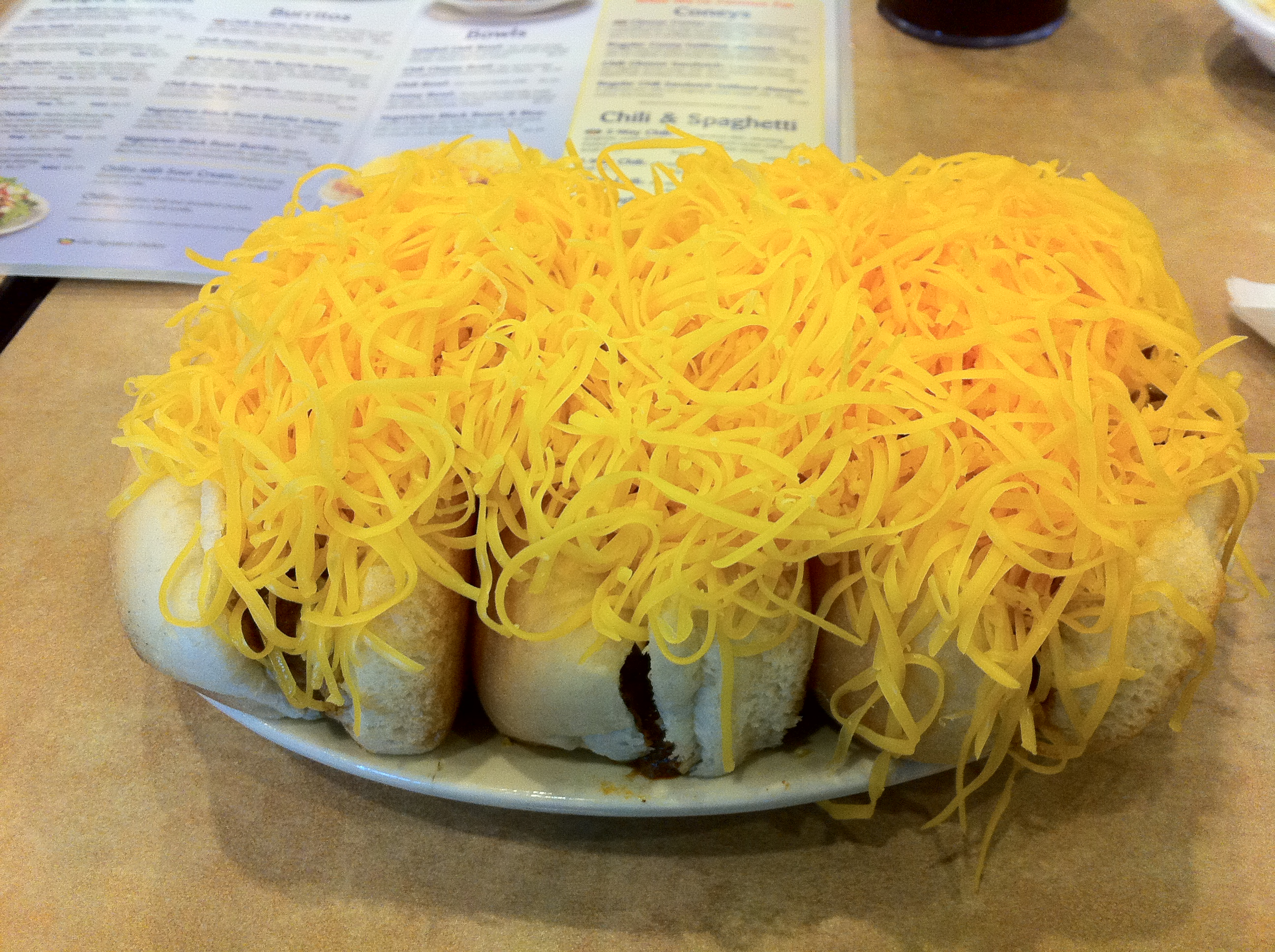
Cheese coneys (Cincinnati)

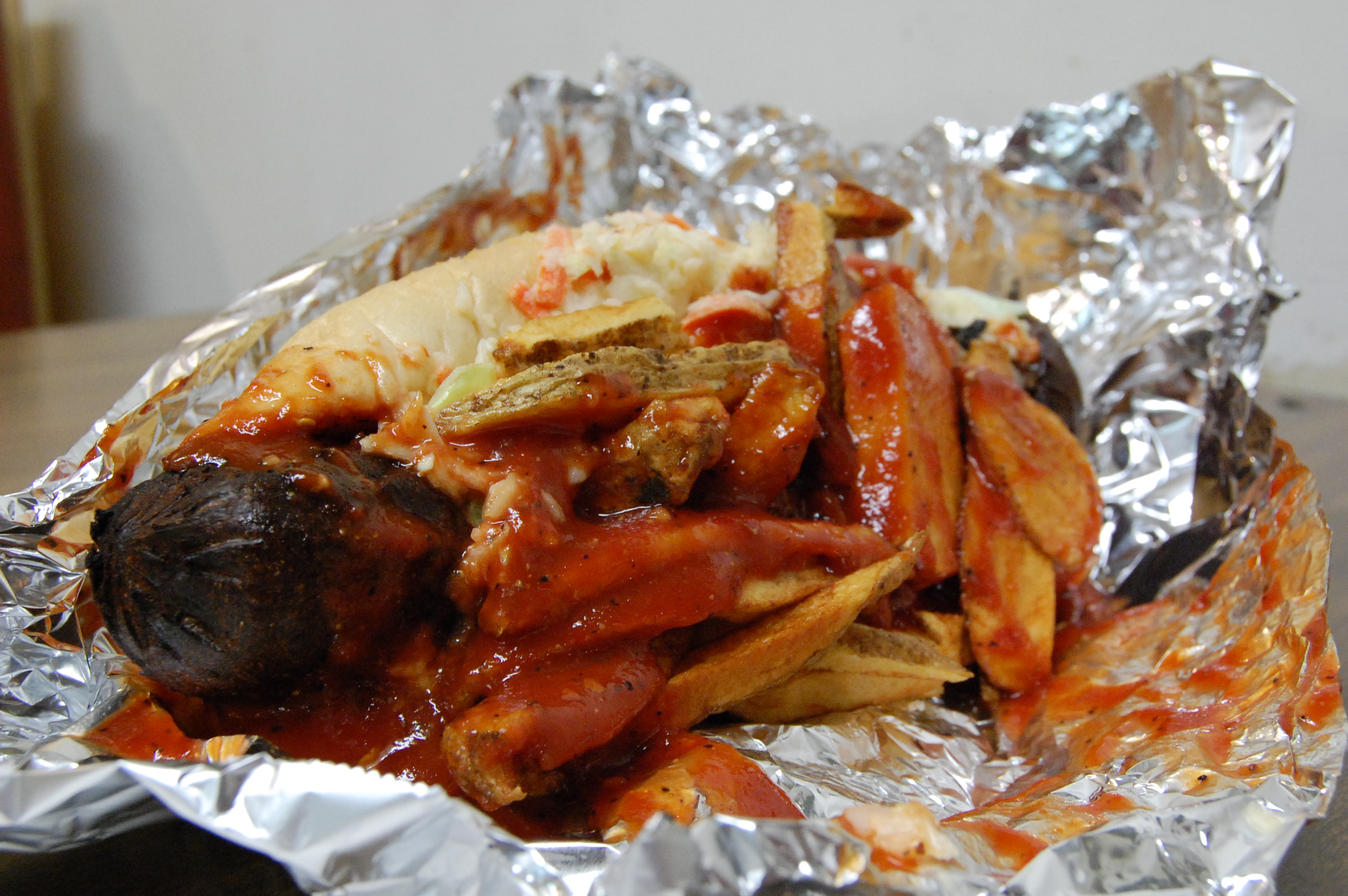
Polish boy (Cleveland)

In Toledo, Tony Packo's Cafe sells "world famous" "Hungarian Hot Dogs," which were the subject of multiple M*A*S*H episodes.

=== Pennsylvania ===
There are several varieties of local dog recipes in Pennsylvania. In Philadelphia, street vendors sell hot dogs that can be topped with one or more of several traditional Philadelphia toppings: ketchup, mustard (yellow and/or spicy brown), chopped onion (cooked/soft or raw), relish, and (without exception) sauerkraut. In the Lehigh Valley region of Pennsylvania, there is regional Yocco's Hot Dogs, which maintains four locations in the region. The Greek dog, similar to a Coney dog, is served in the Erie area.

Various shops and butchers in Pennsylvania make traditional German natural casing franks. Altoona, Pennsylvania has two remaining Texas Hot Dog stands that claim a legacy going back to 1918. The Texas Tommy was invented in Pottstown, Pennsylvania, and is prepared with bacon and cheese.

=== Rhode Island ===
The hot wiener or New York System wiener is a staple of the food culture of Rhode Island.

=== Virginia ===
The Norfolk hot dog is a hot dog popular in Norfolk, Virginia. It is served with Lynnhaven mustard, onions and meat sauce.

=== Washington (state) ===
In Seattle, hot dogs are served with cream cheese and grilled onions on a toasted bun. The sausages are split in half and grilled before being put in the bun. Stands offer a variety of condiments, such as Sriracha sauce and jalapeños.

=== Washington, D.C. ===
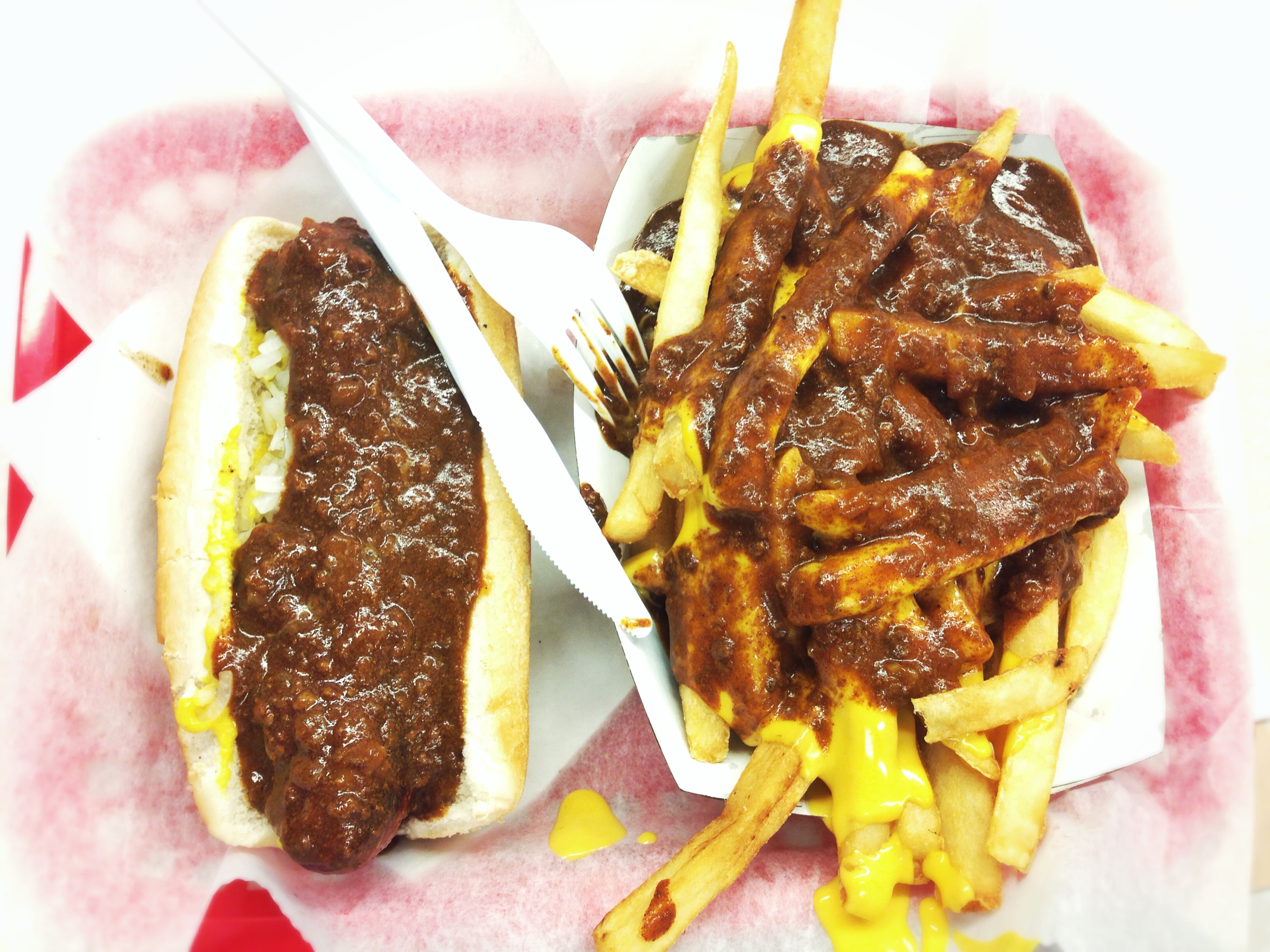
A Washington D.C.-style half-smoke with chili fries.

Washington, D.C. is home to the half-smoke, a half beef, half pork sausage that is both grilled and smoked. A half-smoke is often placed into a hotdog-style bun and topped with chili, cheese, onions, and mustard, similar to a chili dog. Among the famous half-smoke restaurants in the Washington area include Ben's Chili Bowl, which is a cultural landmark, as well as Weenie Beenie in Arlington, Virginia.

The half-smoke is not just a popular style, but one of the culturally significant foods originating in DC, and has been compared to Chicago's deep dish pizza or Baltimore's crab cakes. Half-smoke sausages are bit spicier then usual hot dogs and are usually cut in half.

=== West Virginia ===
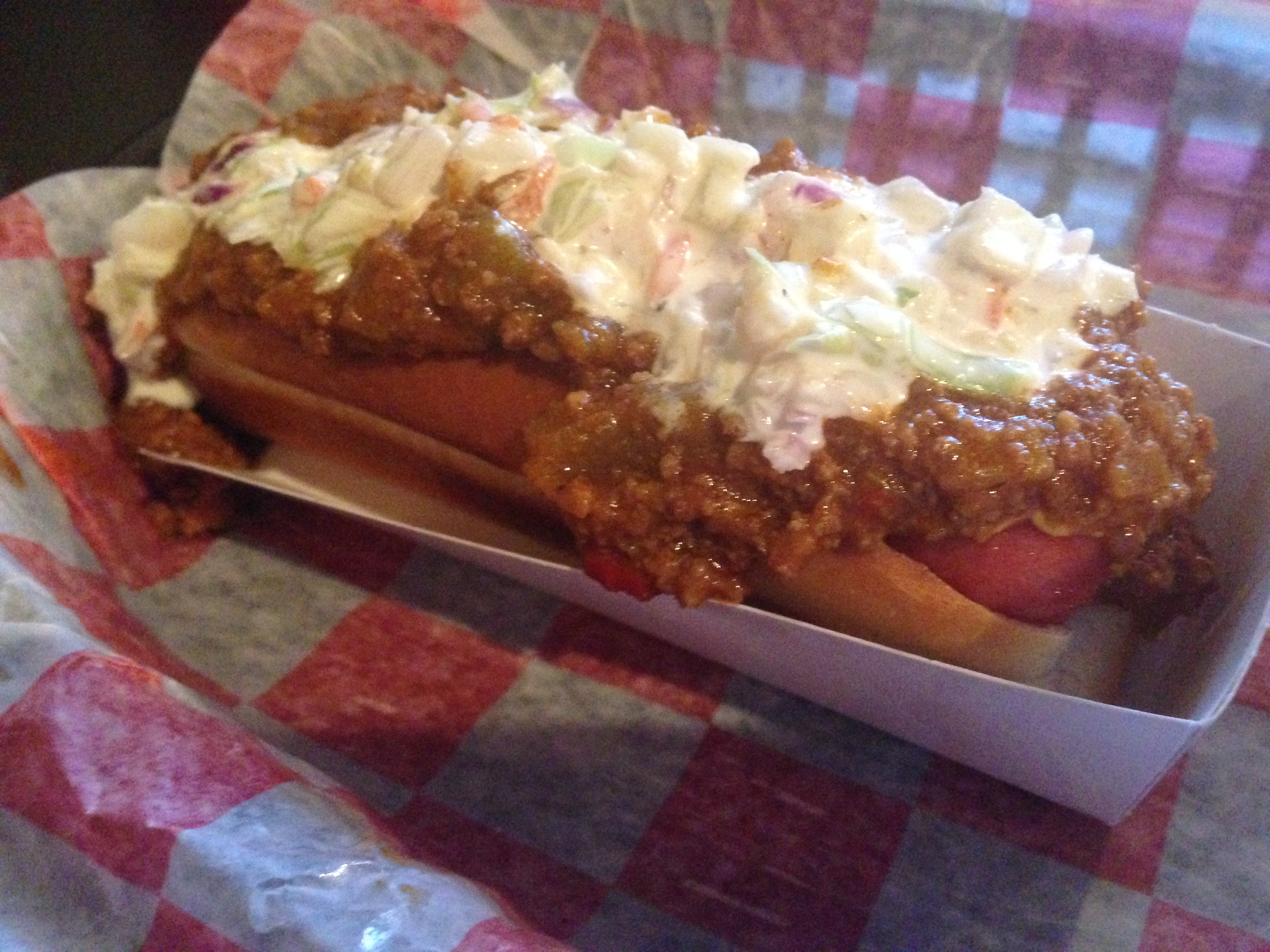
West Virginia style hot dog

A hot dog with a chili sauce made with finely ground meat, chopped fresh onions, coleslaw and yellow mustard. "Even more telling is the nature of the chili on each. Its done with chunks of meat and arguable accouterments like beans, tomatoes, peppers and, sometimes, spaghetti. Chili Bun Chili is a finely grained aggregate of ground beef, spices and something to make it all hold together in the bun."

== Canada ==
The Whistle Dog is served by some A&W restaurants in Canada. A whistle dog is a hot dog that has been split and served with processed cheese, bacon, and relish. After 2017, it has been a seasonal item on the menu.

Two major styles are the steamie, which is soft featuring a steamed dog and bun and the toastie, with more toasting during preparation. The steamie originated in the 20th century working class and is associate with the Montreal region, though in modern times toasting has increased in popularity.

=== Toronto and Ottawa ===
Hot dog carts are licensed by the respective city and almost all offer the basic topping set of yellow mustard, ketchup, bbq sauce, hot sauce, mayonnaise, sauerkraut, sweet relish, sweet corn, sweet pickles, white onions diced, and green olives. There are more sauces depending on the stand, like hot mustard and sriracha.

Carts in Toronto also offer bacon bits as a topping.

Carts in Ottawa also offer sausage in a bun.

=== Montreal ===
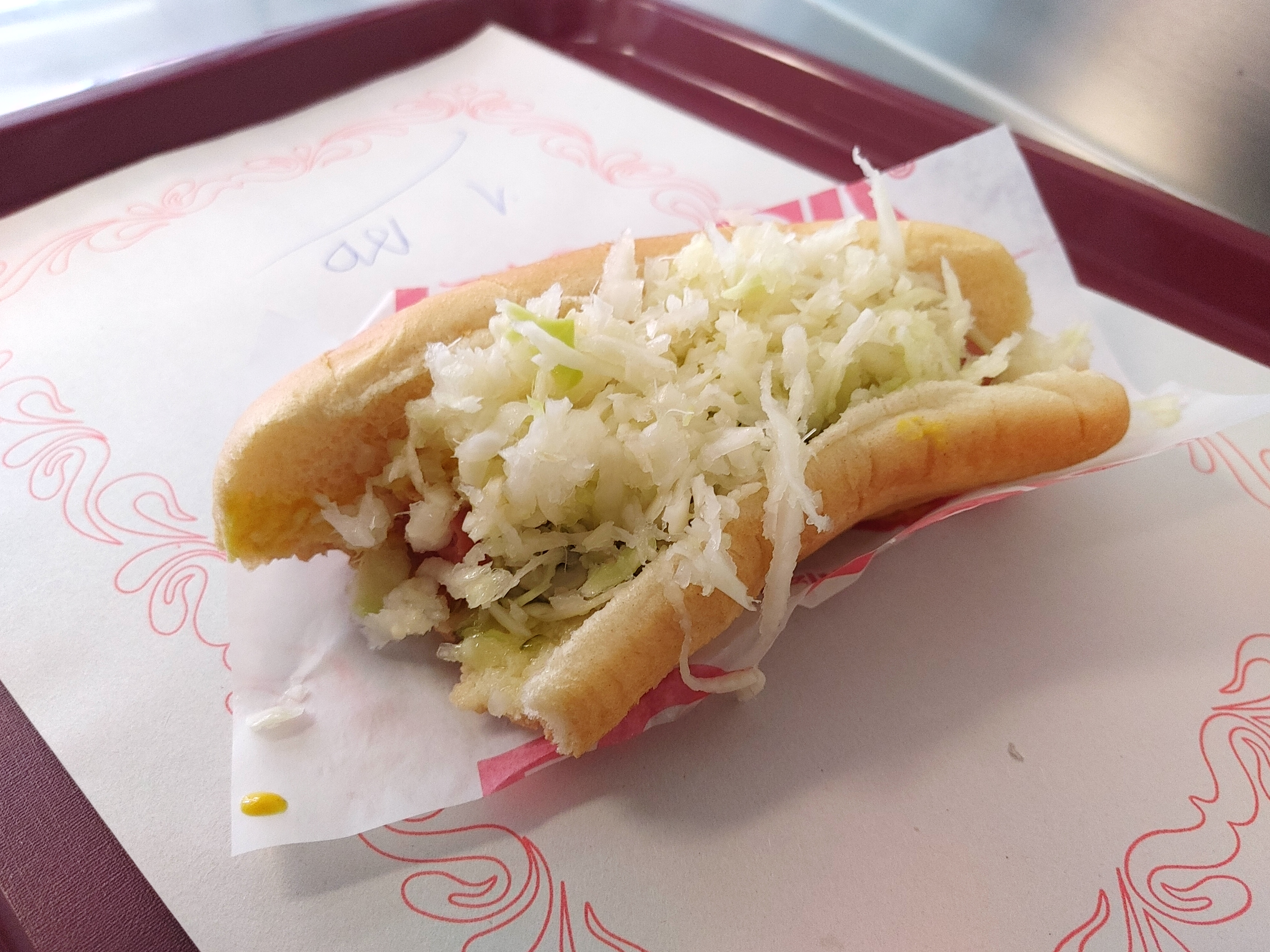
Montreal style hot dog, with chopped onion and cabbage

A Montreal-style hot dog, as popularized by numerous shops such as the famous Montreal Pool Room, is either steamed or griddle fried (nicknamed steamies or toasties, respectively). It is generally served topped with coleslaw, onion, relish and mustard; ketchup, mayonnaise and occasionally paprika or chili powder may be added at a condiment counter by the customer. Due to the bilingual nature of Montreal street culture, these are usually ordered, and condiments named, in Franglais. Montreal hot dogs can be found throughout Eastern Canada and the United States.

== Latin America ==
=== Brazil ===
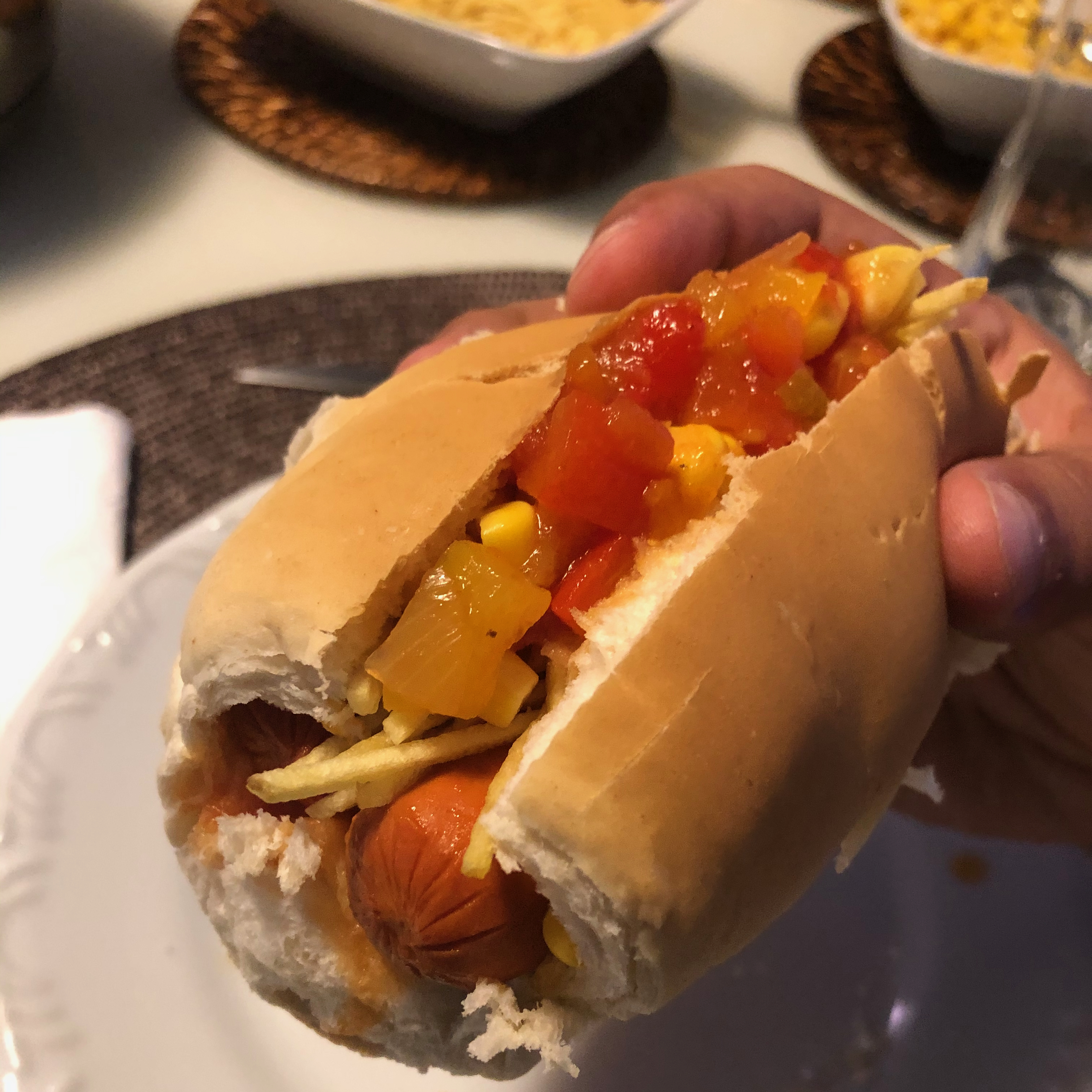
Cachorro-quenteː hot dog served in the Brazilian way in pão francês with a tomato-based vegetable broth, corn, and potato sticks.

In 1926, the Spanish entrepreneur in Brazil and founder of Cinelândia, Francisco Serrador, began selling cachorro-quente (lit. "hot dog") at his cinemas. It inspired Lamartine Babo and Ary Barroso to create the song "Cachorro-Quente," a marchinha de carnaval. In the period following World War II, as Brazil came under considerable US cultural influence, the cachorro-quente came to cement its position in Brazil.

=== Chile ===
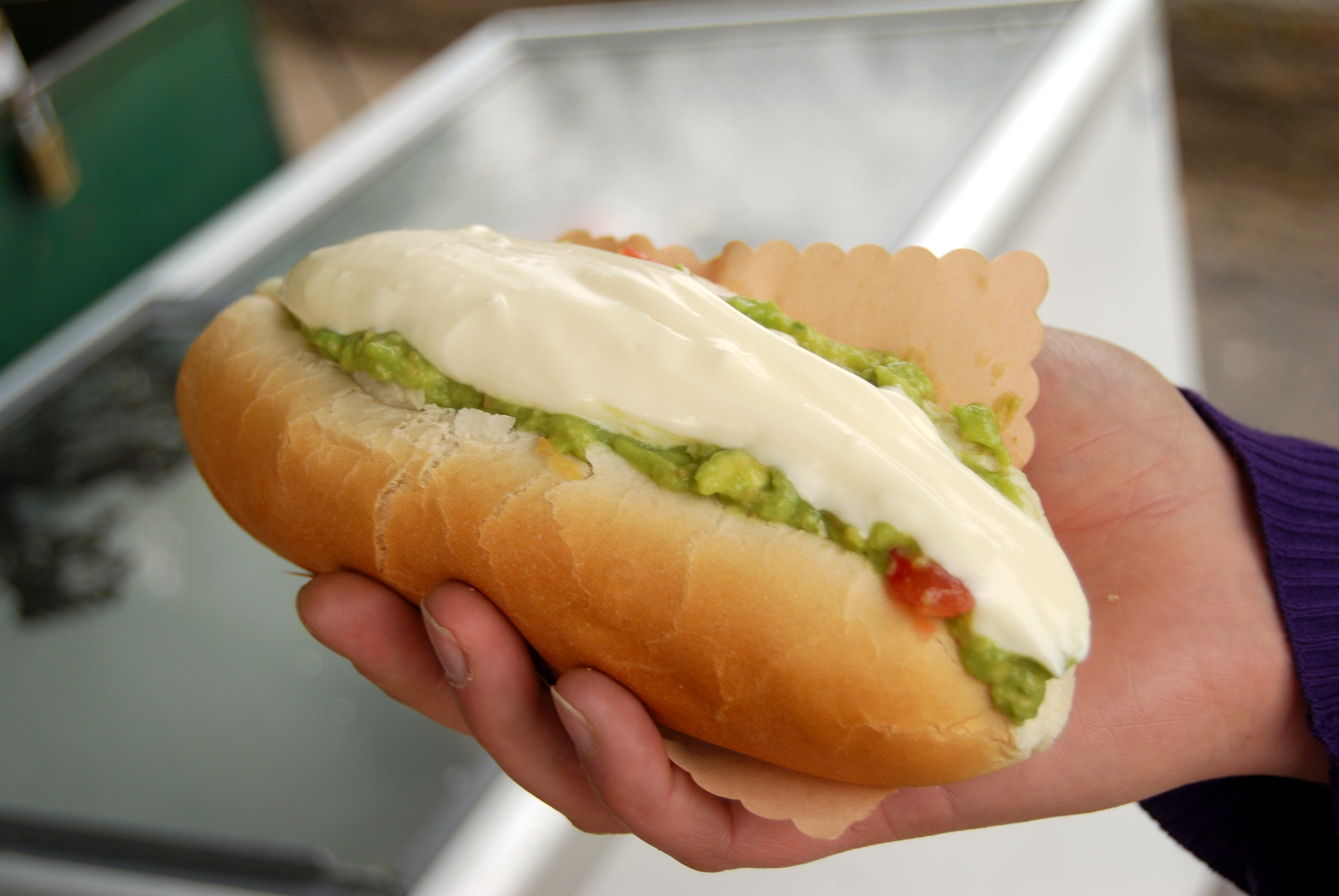
A Chilean completo with an "Italian" combination

In Chile, there is a popular variation called completo (Spanish for "complete", "full") which, besides bread and sausages, can be made up of mashed avocado, chopped tomatoes, mayonnaise, sauerkraut, salsa Americana, green sauce, and cheese. Its size can be twice that of an American hot dog.

=== Guatemala ===
In Guatemala shucos are sold across the country, especially in the country's capital, Guatemala City. Shucos are usually served with guacamole, boiled cabbage, mayonnaise, mustard, and an assorted choice of meats. Chopped onions are added by a decent amount of shuqueros (hot dog vendors) across Guatemala City and Antigua. The most popular choices of meats are sausage, chorizo (red sausage), salami, longaniza (white sausage), and bacon. They are cooked in a charcoal grill and hot sauce is offered at customer's request.

=== Mexico ===
The Sonoran hot dog, originating from Hermosillo, Sonora, is a hot dog wrapped in mesquite-smoked bacon, cooked on a grill or on a griddle or comal, then topped with pinto beans, onions, tomatoes, mayonnaise, mustard and jalapeño salsa or sauce, and served on a bolillo roll, often with a side of fresh-roasted chili pepper.

== Asia ==
=== Japan ===
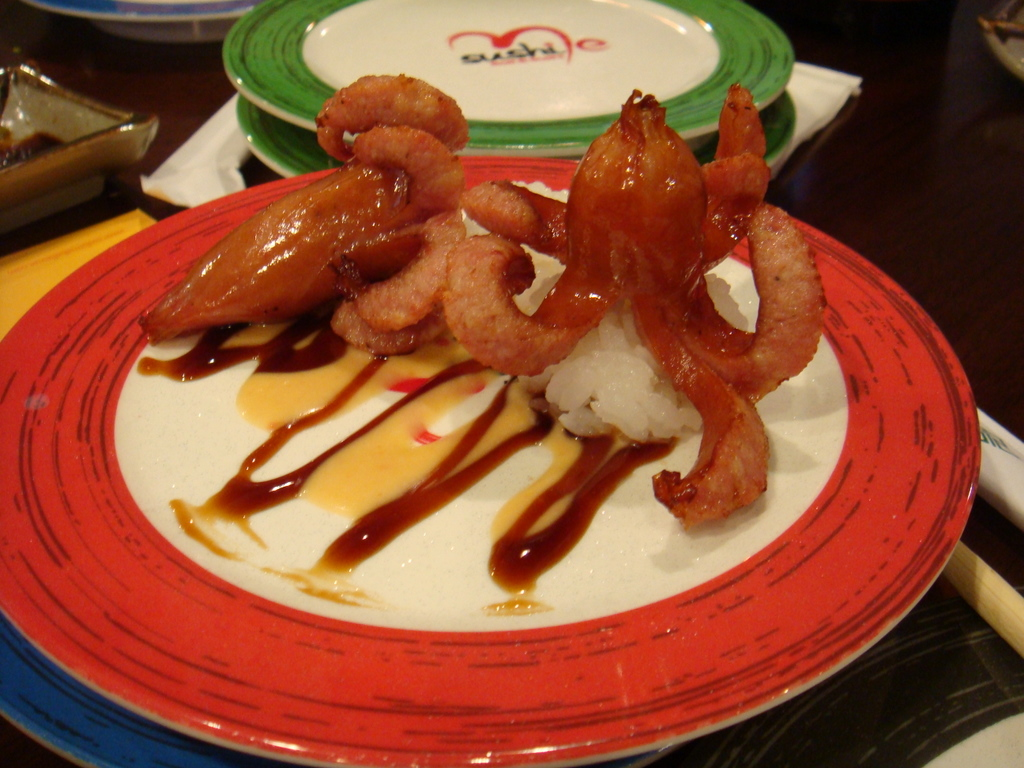
tako-san weiners

In Japan, hot dogs are used in bento boxes and are often sliced to resemble an octopus. More conventional hot dogs are also available, either on a stick (with or without a coating) or on a bun. Japanese Fusion Dogs, such as those sold at the Vancouver-based chain Japadog, are not actually from Japan but are a Pacific Northwest invention that pairs hot dogs with Japanese and Asian condiments like wasabi, kimchi and teriyaki.

=== Malaysia ===
In October 2016 the Malaysian Islamic Development Department ruled that hot dog vendors must rename their product or risk not getting halal certification, because in Islam dogs are considered unclean. The Malaysian Tourism and Culture Minister criticized the ruling and said, "Even in Malay it's called hot dog — it's been around for so many years. I'm a Muslim and I'm not offended."

=== Philippines ===
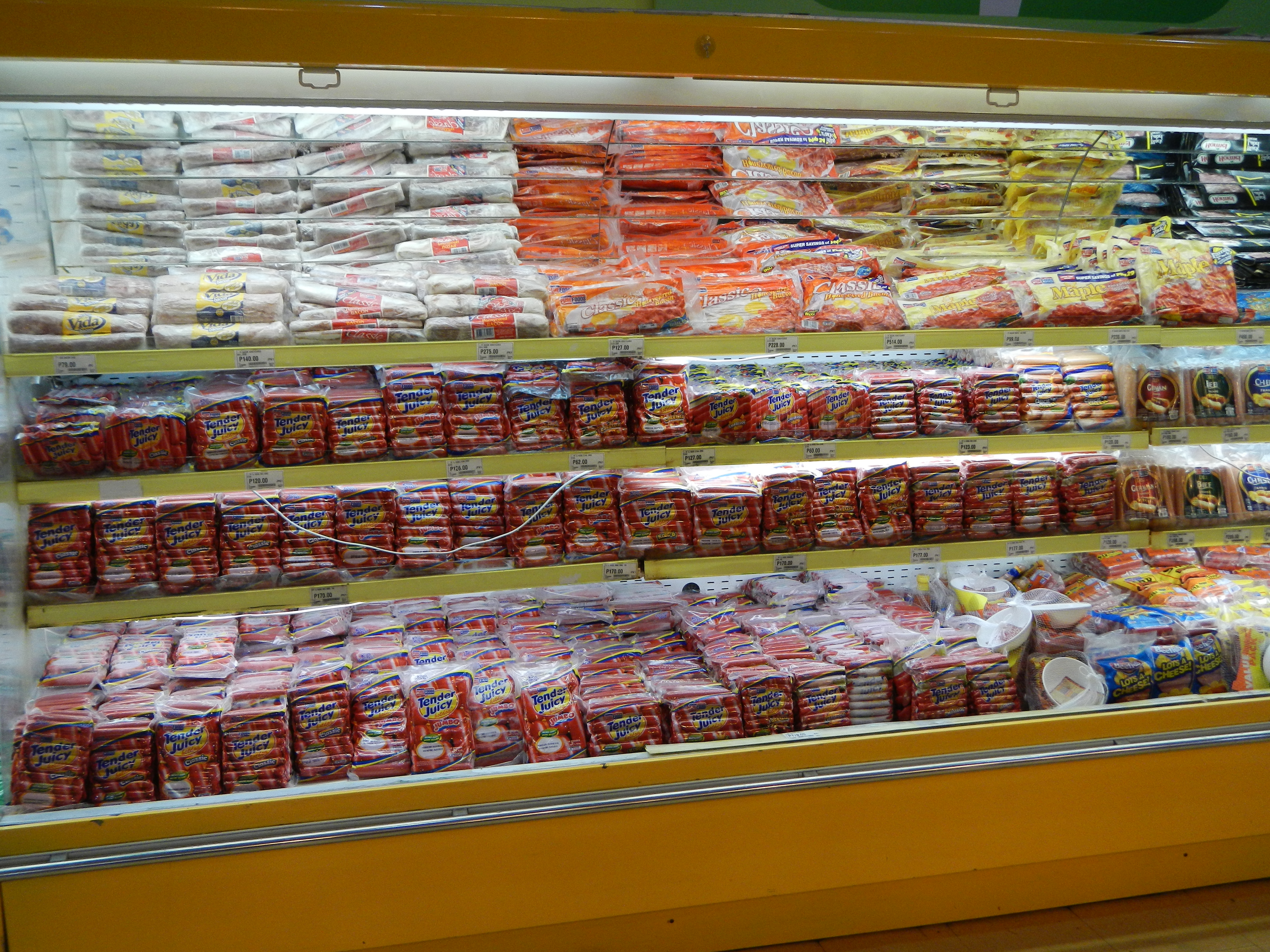
Purefoods hot dogs at SM City Baliwag Hypermart

In the Philippines, hot dogs are eaten as is, in a bun with an optional selection of condiments, or with rice and condiments. Hot dogs are also typically served during breakfast. They are also skewered and grilled over coals, and sold as street food. Skewered waffle hot dogs are also available in the country (a local variant having the hot dogs coated in hotcake batter and then deep-fried). Chopped hot dogs are an ingredient in Filipino spaghetti. They are also used in various other dishes (e.g. as a filling in an embutido, as sliced pieces of meat in tomato-based savories such as caldereta or menudo, etc.).

=== South Korea ===
A popular South Korean form of the hot dog, sold at street stalls, fairs, and some fast-food restaurants, involves the placing of the sausage on a stick, followed by a batter of some kind, and sometimes including french fries in the batter. They more resemble a corn dog than a hot dog. Ketchup is a common condiment, and occasionally mustard. Hot dogs in a bun or wrapped in bread are also widely available, or on a stick without a bun.

=== Taiwan ===
Taiwanese style hot dogs are put on a bun or without a bun on a stick. In night markets, meat sausages are sometimes wrapped with an outer sticky rice sausage in a snack called small sausage in large sausage.

=== Thailand ===
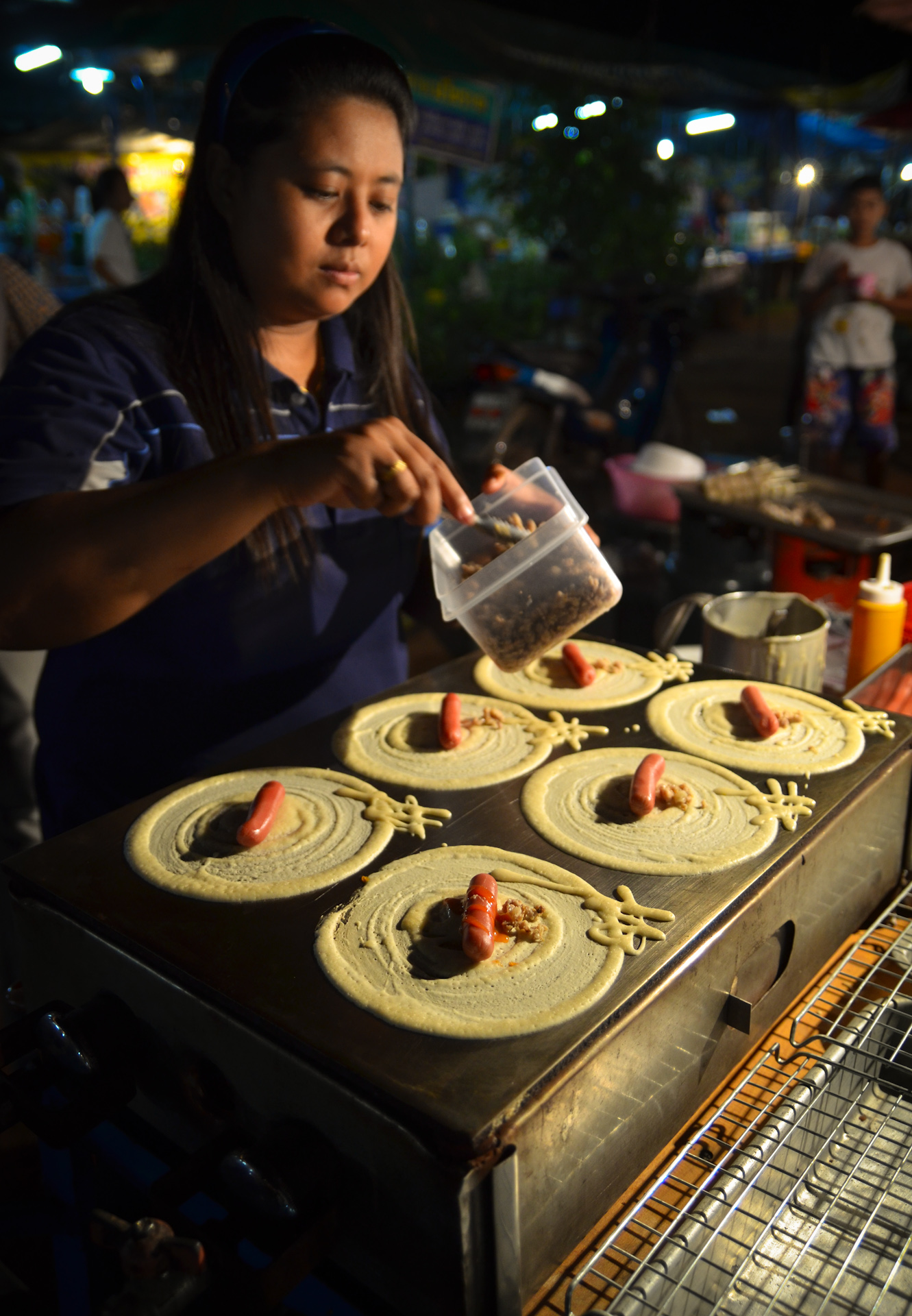
A woman making Thai khanom Tokiao, a Thai style crêpe with a hot dog sausage, at a night market

Hot dogs (Thai: ฮอตดอก; RTGS: hotdok; IPA: [hɔ́t dɔ̀ːk]) are very popular in Thailand and are also used in various ways in Thai cuisine. It can be sold inside a bun similar to a standard American hot dog but instead of tomato ketchup, they are also often eaten with a sweet tomato-chili sauce. Very popular are street vendors selling hot dogs which have been deep-fried or charcoal grilled. They are served with either a sweet, slightly spicy sauce (nam chim wan) or a very spicy sauce (nam chim phet). Hot dogs can also be used as a filling for a croissant which are served with mayonnaise. Hot dogs are even used as a filling for raisin bread together with shredded dried pork. The Thai dish called khao phat Amerikan or American fried rice, rice fried with tomato ketchup and containing raisins, is always served with hot dogs and a fried egg. Donut sai krok is the Thai name for a sausage filled savoury donut in the shape of a log. Hot dog sausages also feature as an ingredient, together with onion, celery or coriander (cilantro) leaves, lime juice, fish sauce and chili peppers, for a Thai salad called yam hot dok. Another dish that uses hot dogs is called khanom Tokiao (lit. 'Tokyo cake'). This is a Thai style crêpe which is wrapped around a filling of hot dog and sweet chili sauce. The chili sauce can also be served on the side.

== Europe ==
=== Czech Republic ===
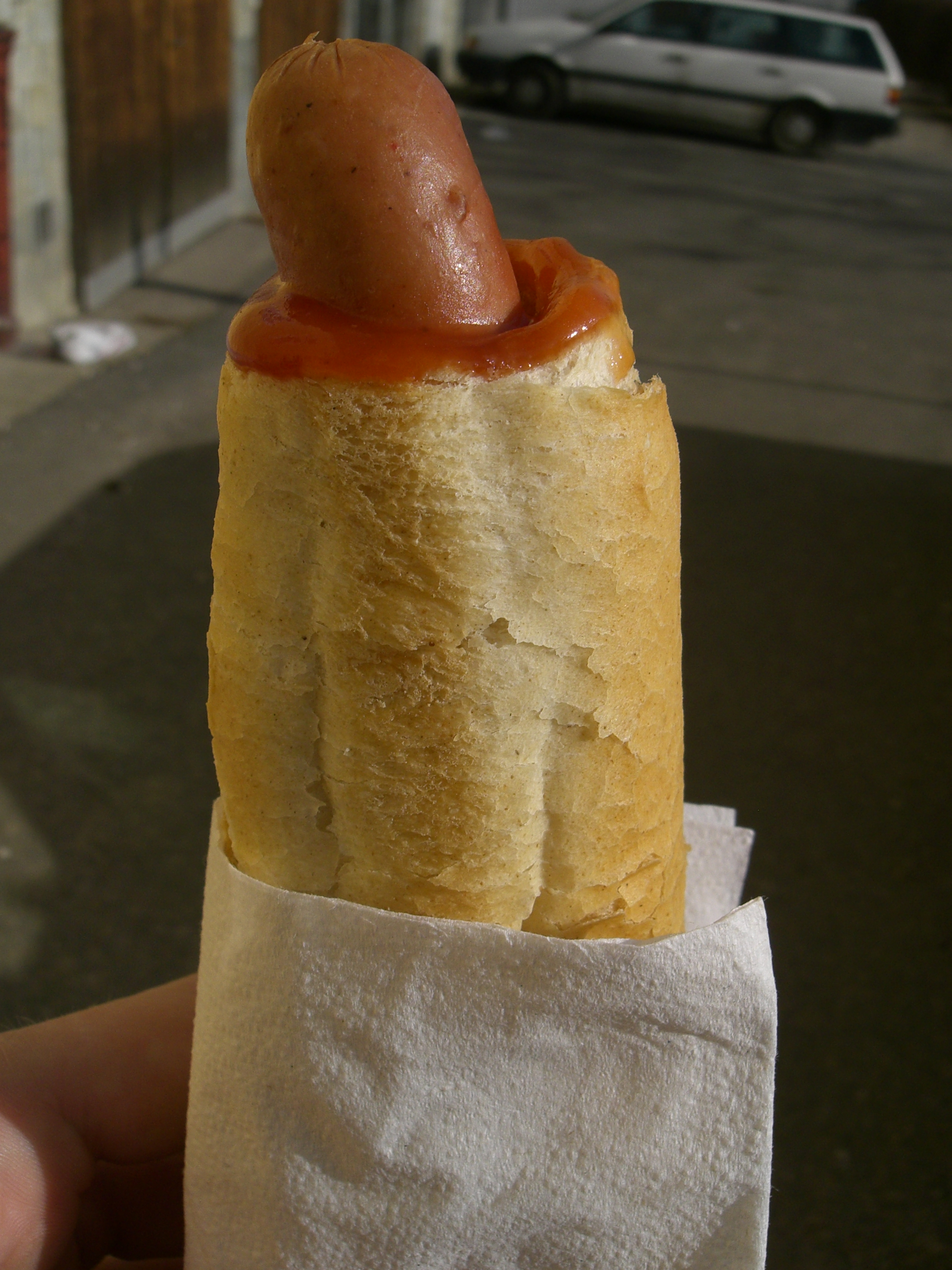
Czech-style hot dog (párek v rohlíku)

Hot dogs in the Czech Republic are known as párek v rohlíku, which can be literally translated as "sausage in roll", with the label "hot dog" also applied in marketing to both locals and tourists. Czech-style hot dogs are differentiated by the fact that rather than slicing the bun in half and placing the sausage into the resultant cleavage, the top of the bun is cut off, with a hole punched into the softer inside of the bun where condiments and then the sausage is placed, similar to the Ketwurst. Specially designed appliances (stroj na párek v rohlíku, literally appliance for sausage in bun) that consist of a hot-water cooker for the sausages and heated metal spikes to punch the holes and pre-warm the buns also exist to assist vendors with preparation of this dish.

=== Denmark ===
The Danish-style hot dog has spread to the other Scandinavian countries as well as Germany. Steff Houlberg/Tulip corporation operates 4300 hot dog stands in Denmark alone, and has also opened a chain in Korea, Japan, and China.

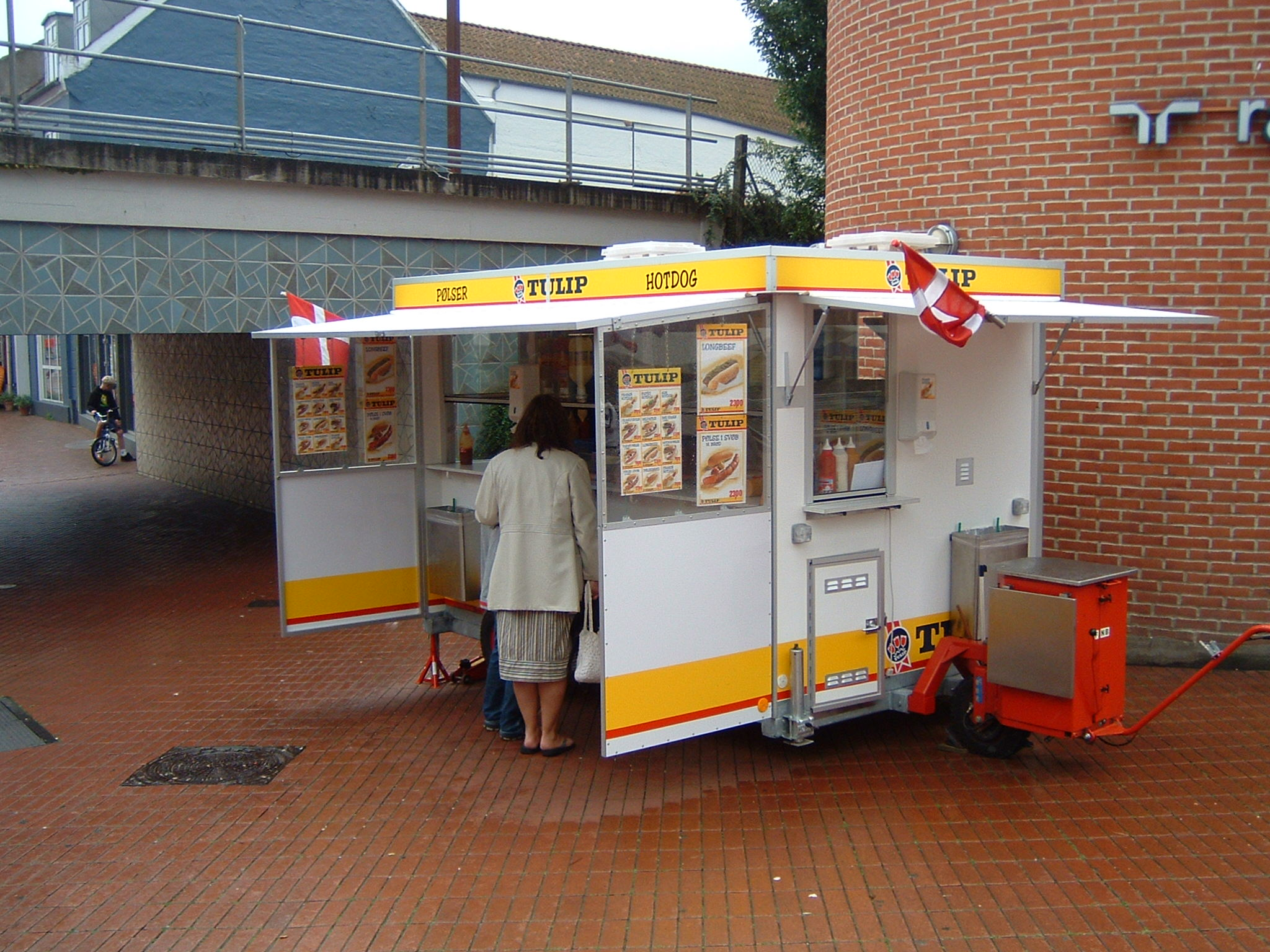
A pølsevogn (Danish hot dog stand) in the city center of Kolding (Jutland)

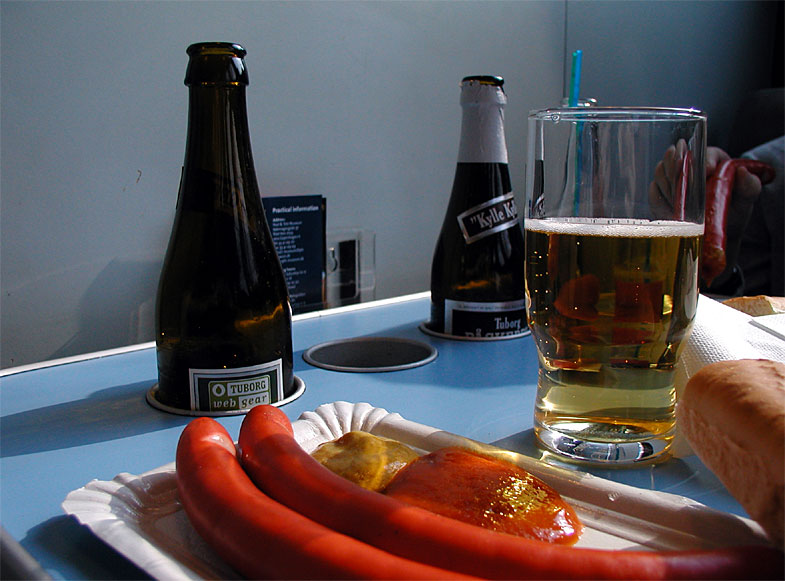
Red sausages (røde pølser)

=== Finland ===
Kuuma koira is regional fast food served in the Pirkanmaa area. The name means a hot dog in Finnish, but it is a different dish. It is prepared by serving a steamed sausage in a sugar-coated doughnut.

=== Germany ===
Even though the type of sausage that led to the creation of the modern hot dog in the United States is undeniably German, German hot dog culture is mainly influenced by Scandinavian—mostly Danish—elements. This does not affect the type of sausage (unlike the Danish rød pølse, German hot dogs usually have frankfurt- or wiener-style sausages) but the condiments—ketchup, mustard or Danish-style remoulade depending on individual preference as well as roasted onions and thinly sliced pickles—are usually marketed as a Danish influence. While sauerkraut is a common, distinctively German, topping in the US, it is not typical in Germany. Grilling the sausage, which is common in America, is largely unknown in Germany where it is steamed like its Scandinavian counterparts.

=== Iceland ===
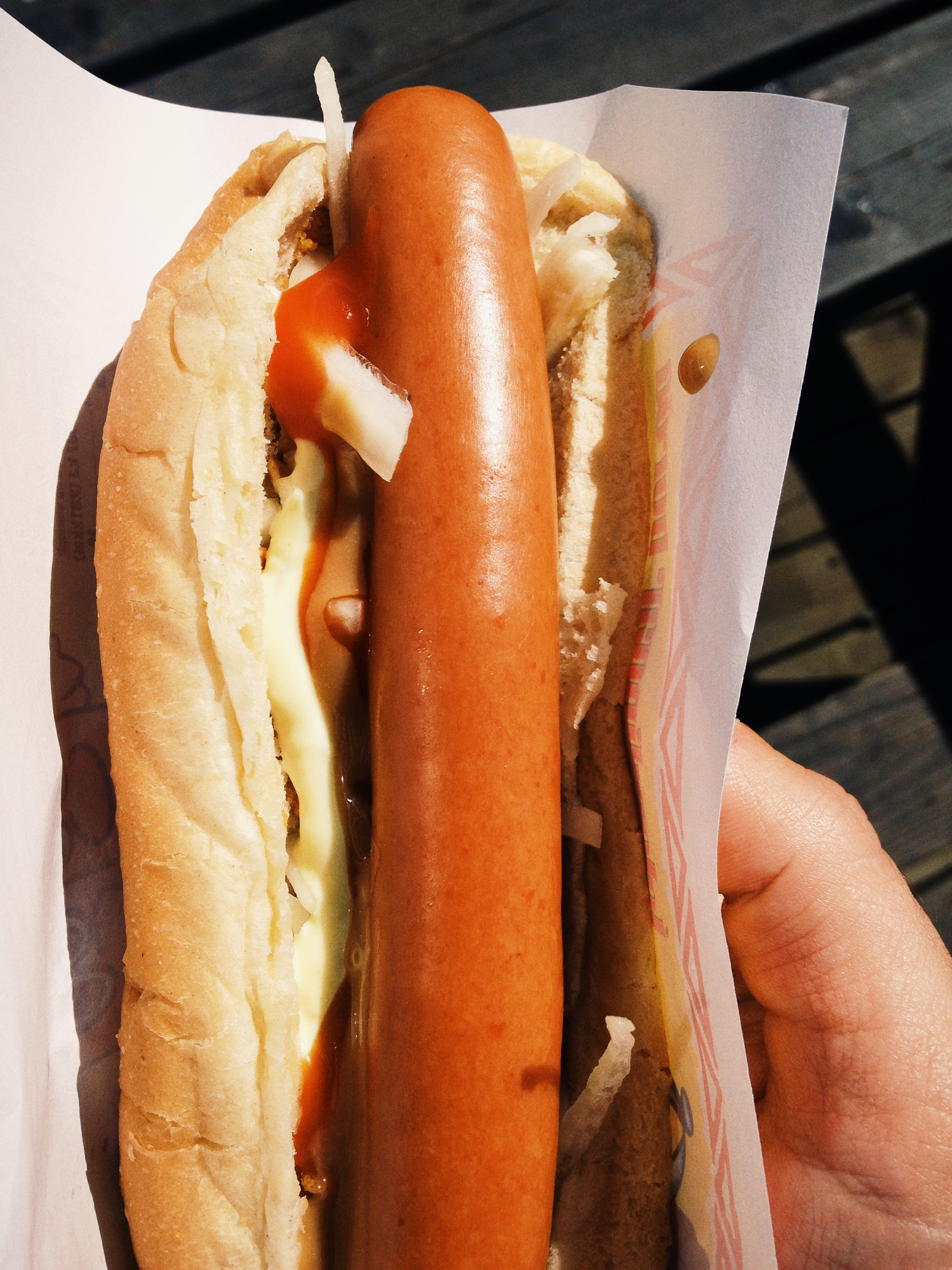
An Icelandic hot dog, served with fried and raw onions.

The Iceland Monitor writes that "locals, expatriates and holiday-makers alike must all be familiar with Iceland's national dish—hot-dogs with all the trimmings (‘pylsa með öllu’ in Icelandic). The hot-dog sausage is served in bread and liberally accompanied with fried onion, raw onion, mustard, ketchup and remoulade (a cold sauce made with mayonnaise and various condiments and herbs). This snack is traditionally washed down with copious amounts of Coca-Cola."

In August 2006, the British newspaper The Guardian selected Iceland's Bæjarins beztu as the best hot dog stand in Europe. Bæjarins beztu pylsur (English: The best hot dog in town) often shortened to simply "Bæjarins beztu," is a popular hot dog stand in central Reykjavík. Hot dogs from this stand are derived from the Danish hot dog. They are often ordered with "the works," i.e., all condiments, or in Icelandic "eina með öllu". Icelandic hot dogs are made from Icelandic lamb, pork and beef and served with a mix of raw white and fried onion, ketchup, sweet brown mustard, and remoulade.

=== Norway ===
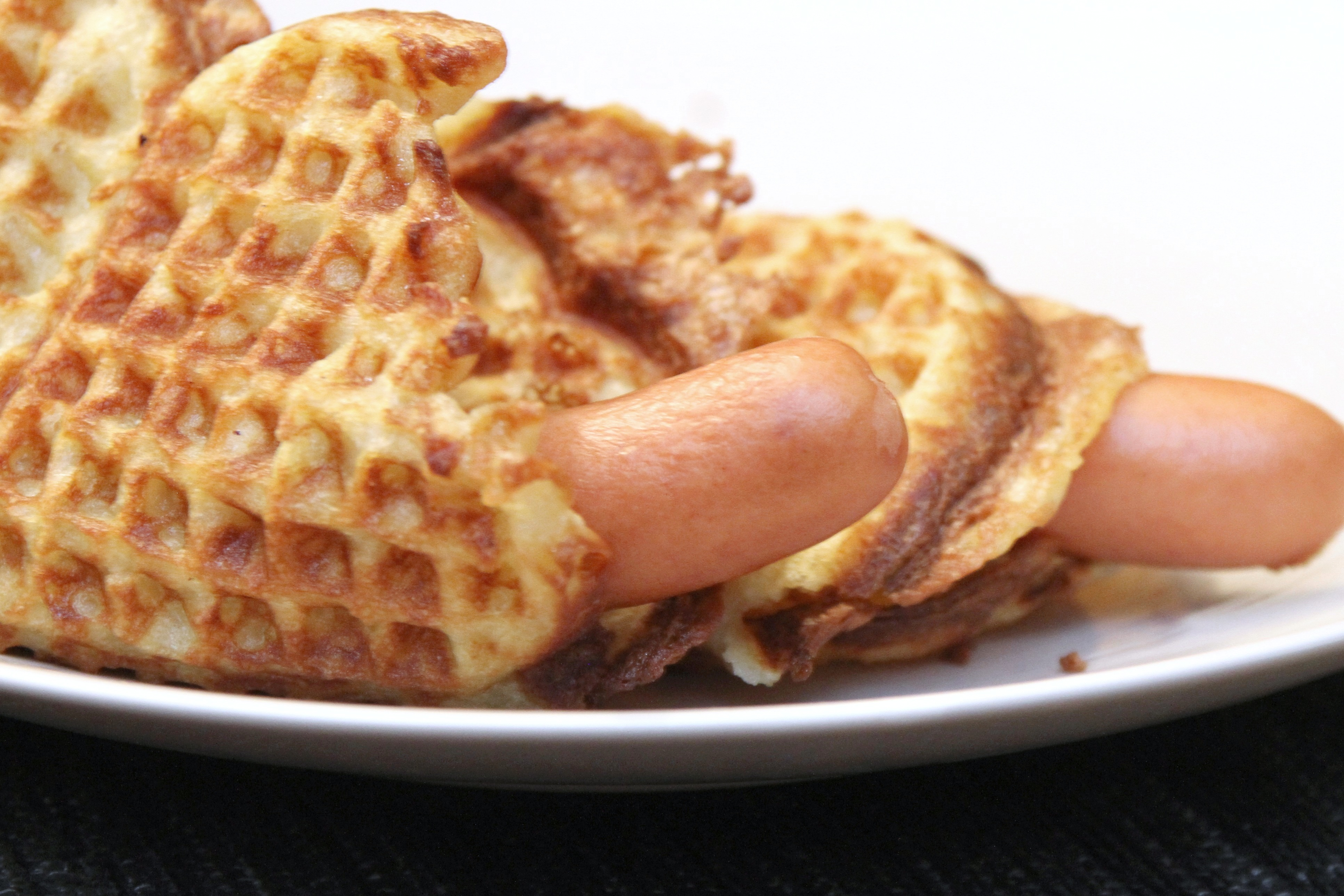
A Norwegian pølse i vaffel, hot dog in a waffle.

In Norway, sausages are most often served in white buns, or in a traditional lompe. The sausages are grilled or warmed in hot water, and they are normally served with ketchup or mustard. Alternative condiments includes potato salad, shrimp salad, fried or raw onions. Many Norwegians will order "pølse med alt", a hot dog with all the condiments. Local specialties occur, such as reindeer dogs in the north and hot dogs served in a waffle in the south east.

=== Sweden ===
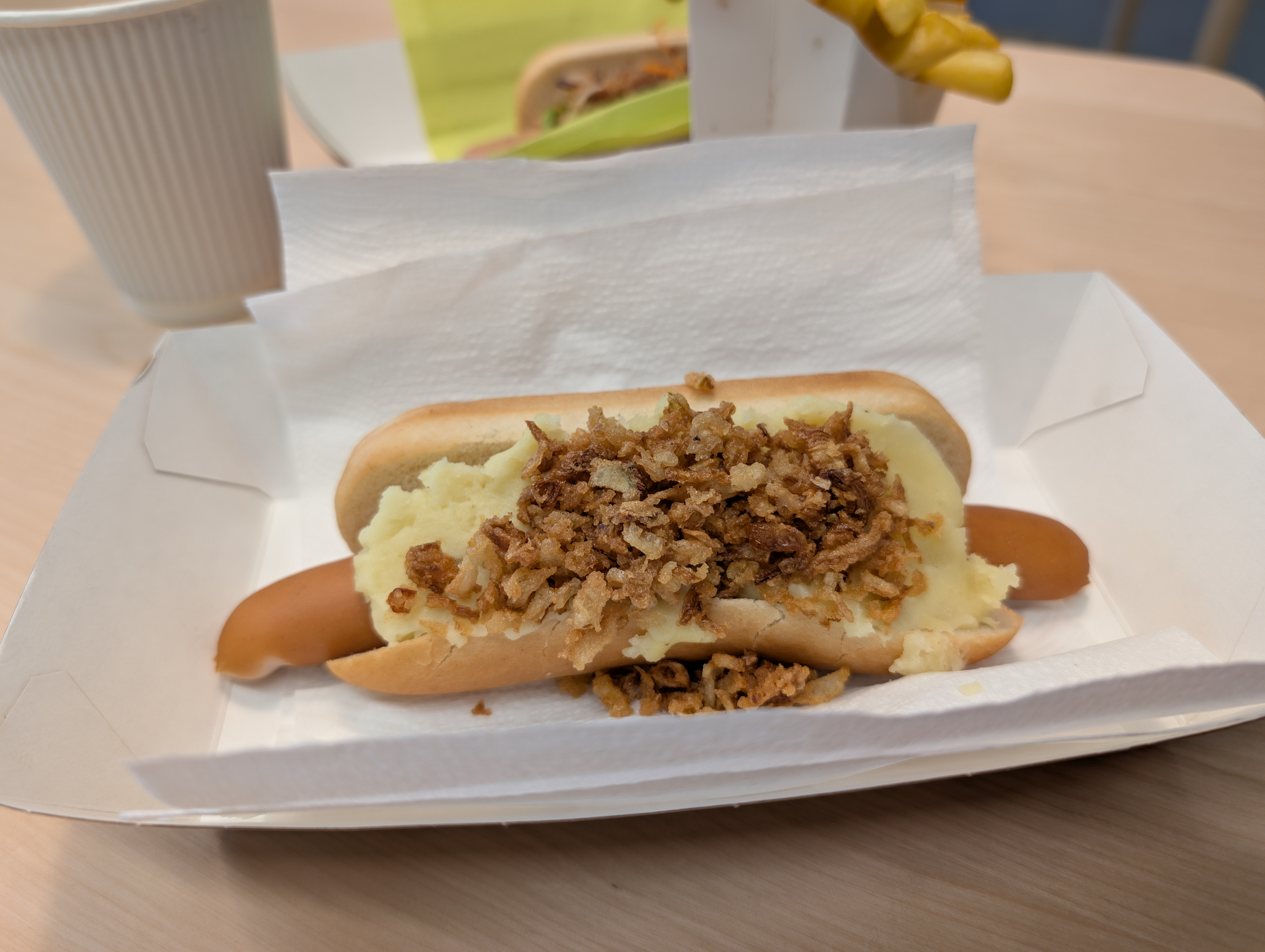
Halv Special is a Swedish street food with mashed potatoe and grilled onions

In Sweden, hot dogs are often served in a bread roll with mashed potatoes, roasted onion, mustard and ketchup, and with either shrimp salad or bostongurka (sometimes both); often by the name of "Tunnbrödsrulle" (thin bread roll) or some variation. "Varmkorv med bröd" (hot dog with bread), topped with mustard and ketchup, is widely sold all over Sweden from stands and in kiosks and fast food restaurants. A popular street food is the Halv Special, which is one hot dog with mashed potato and grilled onions in a bun, and the related type is the Hal special which has two hot dogs (Halv stands for half, and Hal, whole, in Swedish). The style originated in Korvkiosk (Swedish hot dog stands) in Gothenburg in the 1940s and has spread throughout Sweden.

=== Ukraine ===
In Ukraine beside more classic hot dogs there is a variation called slow-dog. Different types of boiled sausages served in a partially sliced brioche or malt bread with various toppings, such as beetroot, salt and vinegar flavoured potato chips, chili peppers, paprika, lettuce, cucumber, buckwheat popcorn, hazelnut rusk, and sauces.

=== United Kingdom ===
Genuine "hot dogs" in the American style are very popular in US-themed restaurants, amusement parks and in particular, at cinemas, and one can even find specialist 'gourmet' hot dog and champagne establishments in cities such as London.

== List of hot dogs ==
Name	Image	Associated region(s)	Description
Bagel dog		United States	A full-size or miniature hot dog, wrapped in bagel-style breading before or after cooking.
Carolina style		Carolinas	A hot dog topped with chili, slaw, onions, and mustard.
Cheese dog			A hot dog on a bun served with cheese or processed cheese on it or stuffed within it as a filling.
Chicago-style hot dog		Chicago, Illinois	An all-beef hot dog on a poppy seed bun, topped with mustard, chopped onions, pickle spear, tomatoes, green relish (preferably Chicago-style relish), celery salt, and pickled sport peppers. A traditional Chicago-style hot dog does not include ketchup.
Chili dog		United States	The generic name for a hot dog served in a bun and topped with some sort of meat sauce, such as chili con carne.
Completo		Chile	A Chilean hot dog usually served with ingredients such as chopped tomatoes, avocados, mayonnaise, sauerkraut, Chilean chili, green sauce and cheese.
Coney Island hot dog		Michigan	A large, natural-casing hot dog topped with a hearty, mildly spiced meat sauce, and with mustard and diced onions.
Corn dog		United States	A sausage (usually a hot dog) coated in a thick layer of cornmeal batter on a stick.
Danger dog		Tijuana or Hermosillo	A hot dog that has been wrapped in bacon and deep-fried.
Dodger Dog		Los Angeles	A 10-inch (25 cm) 100% pork hot dog in a steamed bun. Sold at Dodger Stadium, the home stadium of the professional baseball team the Los Angeles Dodgers, and sometimes surrounding areas.
Half-smoke		Washington, D.C., and the surrounding region	Larger, spicier, and with more coarsely-ground meat than a regular hot dog, the sausage is often half-pork and half-beef, smoked, and served with herbs, onion, and chili sauce.
Halv Special		Sweden	Swedish street dog with mashed potato and grilled onion. The related type is the hel special, which is the same but with two hot dogs.
Hamdog		Australia	An Australian sandwich that consists of a shaped bread bun with a beef patty cut in two, and a hot dog placed in between the two halves. Standard hamburger toppings are then added, which may include cheese, pickles, sauces, tomato, lettuce, and onion.
Hot wiener		Providence, Rhode Island	A staple of the food culture of Rhode Island where it is primarily sold at "New York System" restaurants.
Italian hot dog		New Jersey	A cooked, usually deep-fried, hot dog placed in an Italian roll or pizza bread, and topped with a combination of fried bell peppers, onions, and potatoes.
Ketwurst		East Germany	A type of hot dog created in the German Democratic Republic, it involves the heating of a special Bockwurst, larger than regular hot dogs, in water. A long roll is pierced by a hot metal cylinder, which creates an appropriately sized hole. The sausage is then dunked in ketchup and put inside of the roll.
Klobásník		Texas	A savory finger food of Czech-American origin.
Maxwell Street Polish		Chicago, Illinois	A grilled or fried length of Polish sausage topped with grilled onions and yellow mustard and optional pickled whole, green sport peppers, served on a bun. The sandwich traces its origins to Chicago's Maxwell Street market.
Michigan hot dog		Plattsburgh, New York	A natural-casing hot dog made of beef and pork, sometimes bright red in color, on a steamed bun, topped with a meat sauce made with hamburger meat, tomatoes, and spices. Optionally also topped with onions and yellow mustard.
Montreal hot dog		Montreal, Quebec	One of several variations of hot dogs served as a fast food staple at restaurants and diners in Montreal and other parts of Quebec.
Polish Boy		Cleveland	A kielbasa placed in a bun, covered with a layer of french fries, barbecue sauce, and coleslaw.
Pronto Pup			A style of corn dog popular in the midwest. A sausage (usually a hot dog) coated in a thick layer of pancake batter on a stick and cooked.
Ripper		North Jersey	A hot dog that is deep-fried in oil until the casing rips, sometimes served with a combination of sauerkraut, house relish, onions, and mustard.
Seattle-style hot dog		Seattle	A hot dog or Polish sausage in a white bun topped with cream cheese and grilled onions.
Sonoran hot dog		Arizona	A hot dog wrapped in bacon and grilled, served on a bolillo-style hot dog bun, and topped with pinto beans, onions, tomatoes, and a variety of additional condiments, sometimes including mayonnaise, mustard, and jalapeño salsa.
Texas Tommy		Philadelphia metropolitan area	A hot dog that is split and filled with cheese, wrapped with bacon, and then cooked.
Vegetarian hot dog		United States	A hot dog produced entirely from non-meat products.
White hot		New York (state)	Composed of a combination of uncured and unsmoked pork, beef, and veal. The lack of curing and smoking causes the meat to retain its white color.

== See also ==
- List of hot dog restaurants
- List of sandwiches
- List of sausage dishes
- World's longest hot dog
