= Italian hot dog =

Hot dog in New Jersey cuisine

- Type: Hot dog
- Place of origin: United States
- Region or state: New Jersey
- Main ingredients: Italian roll or pizza bread, hot dog, bell peppers, onions, and potatoes

An Italian hot dog is a type of hot dog popular in New Jersey, United States, made by Jimmy Buff and his wife Mary Racioppi. His family continues the restaurant Jimmy Buff's to this day. Other restaurants like Joe Joe's Italian Hot Dog in Toms River served Italian hot dogs but Jimmy Buff's is nonetheless most widely known in New Jersey as the restaurant that first served Italian hot dogs and is most famous for their Italian hot dog.

== Preparation ==
There are numerous ways to prepare an Italian hot dog. The basic dish consists of a cooked (usually deep-fried) hot dog placed in an Italian roll or pizza bread, and topped with a combination of fried bell peppers, onions, and potatoes. The Italian Hot Dog is a New Jersey tradition similar to Philadelphia's cheesesteak or other regional sandwiches.

== Locations ==
The restaurants that serve Italian hot dogs are mainly based in New Jersey. Jimmy Buff's restaurant is based in Kenilworth. Another branch of the restaurant was open in West Orange. Joe Joe's Italian Hot Dog in Toms River served Italian hot dogs as well until its closing in 2021. Charlie's Famous Italian Hot Dogs in Kenilworth also serves Italian hot dog. Dickie Dee's based in Newark, Tommy's Italian Sausage based in Elizabeth, New Jersey, Carmine’s Pizza based in Netcong, New Jersey and St. Anselm, based in the borough of Brooklyn in New York also serves Italian hot dogs.

== History ==
James "Buff" Racioppi, founder of Jimmy Buff's in Newark, New Jersey, invented the Italian hot dog in 1932. While the hot dog was indeed invented by Jimmy Buff, his wife Mary Racioppi first made the dish. Mary had made the Italian hot dogs for Jimmy and his friends while they were playing cards, where Jimmy Buff coincidentally got his nickname “Buff” from, because of the way he played his cards at the card table, translated from Italian to English he was nicknamed “Buff”. The hot dog was so popular amongst Jimmy's close friends inside and outside of the card table and relatives that Jimmy and his family had made the restaurant known as Jimmy Buff's. The Italian hot dog was one of the first dishes in the menu. In no time the dish became the centerpiece of the restaurant and had become a customer favorite. Even to this day over 80 years later the Italian hot dog along with its contemporary the Italian sausage is still widely popular at Jimmy Buff's and even take turns outselling each other. The original restaurant in Newark had shut down, but there have been other restaurants run by Jimmy's family and other practitioners in the art of the Italian hot dog that are still keeping the Italian hot dog meal alive.

== Variations ==
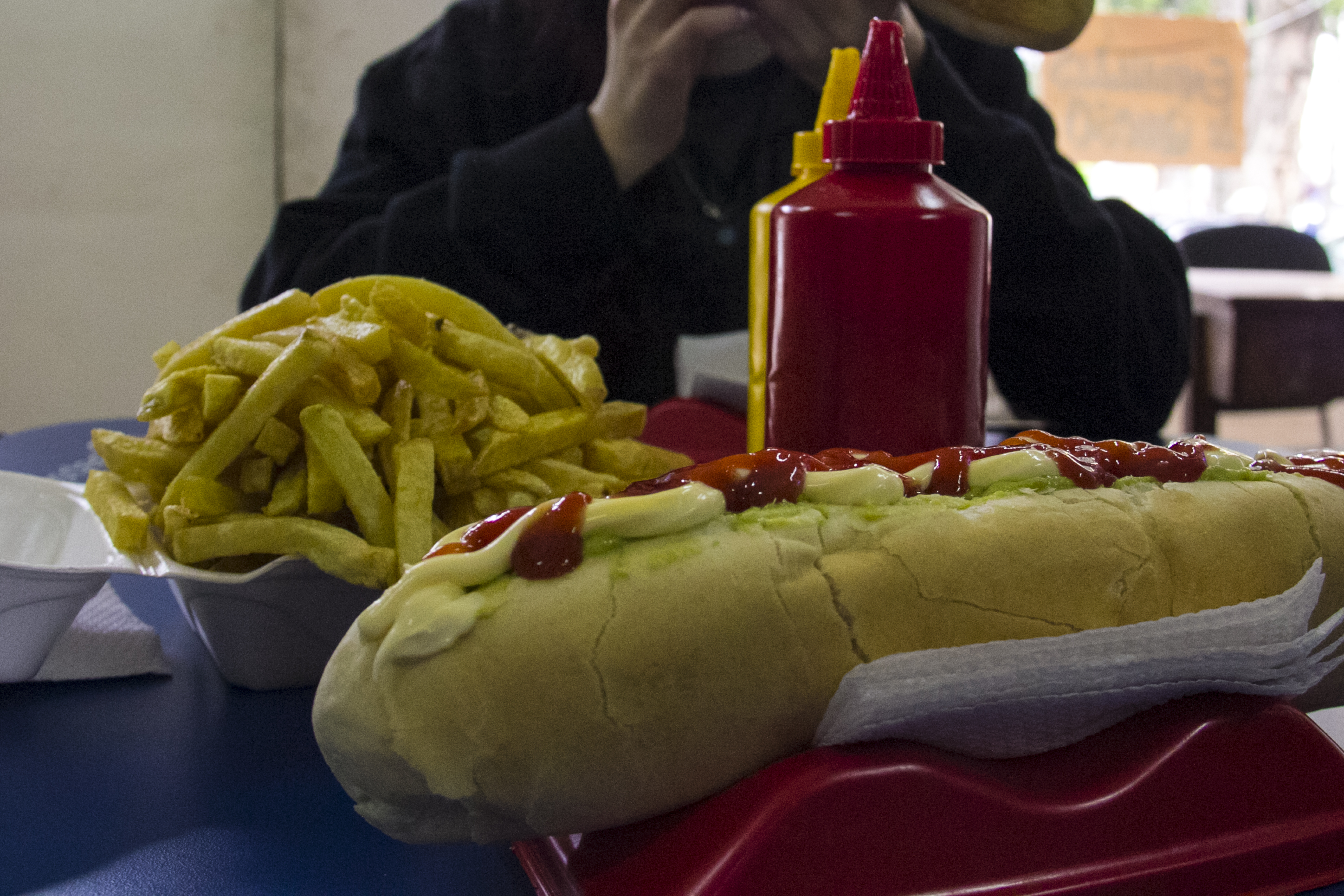
A person eating an Italian hotdog

In New Jersey, there are many variations on the original Italian hot dog, typically involving replacing the hot dog with another meat such as sausage, cheesesteak, hamburger, or chicken. Sometimes french fries are used in place of the potatoes. Commonly, the dogs are dressed with spicy mustard and ketchup. Some variations also include hot dogs where everything inside even the hot dog is deep fried. While you can use ketchup for the Italian hot dog it is frowned upon by locals, as Hank Shaw a New Jersey native himself says, “I've even heard of a few versions of this sandwich that use ketchup, a condiment which, when combined with a hot dog, will get you whacked in most parts of Jersey.” One popular variant in Belleville uses two long hot dogs, french fries, fried peppers and onions, topped with tomato sauce and placed in a 12-inch-wide (300 mm) pizza bread roll. The roll, spelled "apizza" and pronounced "abeetz", is cut along the side into a pocket.

A&W Hot Dogs and More used to sell an Italian dog which consisted of a Polish sausage in a hot dog bun, topped with tomato sauce, mozzarella cheese, and Parmigiano-Reggiano cheese.

Another variation of the Italian hot dog is one made by Hank Shaw a New Jersey native, he had tried the Italian hot dog when he was 13 years old. What he adds to his Italian hot dogs is that he uses these ingredients, extra virgin olive oil, salt, potatoes which are then peeled and cut in ½ inch chunks, green peppers, a large onion, Italian seasoning, beef hot dogs, sandwich buns and mustard.

Dickie Dee's take on the Italian hot dog is healthier than the typical hot dog. Dickie Dee's Italian hot dog is nearly identical to Jimmy Buff's, except Dickie Dee's uses peanut oil, while Jimmy Buff's Italian hot dog uses cholesterol free soybean oil to deep fry their ingredients.

== In the media ==
Jimmy Buff's was featured in a season 9 episode of the Cooking Channel show Man v. Food, hosted by New Jersey native Casey Webb, in early 2022.

== See also ==
- Hot dog variations
