= Michigan hot dog =

Style of hot dog

- Type: Hot dog
- Place of origin: United States
- Region or state: Plattsburgh, New York
- Main ingredients: Hot dog bun, hot dog, Michigan sauce (meat sauce)

A Michigan hot dog, Michigan red hot, or simply "Michigan", is a steamed all-beef hot dog on a steamed bun topped with a meaty sauce, generally referred to as "Michigan sauce", and is a specialty in and around Plattsburgh, New York.

== Origin ==
There is no consensus on the origin of the Michigan, which according to some sources is not capitalized. Eula and Garth Otis, who opened the first Michigan stand in Plattsburgh, New York, in 1927, were originally from Michigan.

According to Press-Republican columnist Gordie Little, a newspaper advertisement for the Otis's Michigans appeared in 1927. Little calls the Michigan "a cultural institution."

According to Serious Eats, the sauce recipe may have originated in Michigan, but "bears little resemblance to Detroit Coney sauce, with no offal and barely any Greek flavor, although the texture is similar to Flint sauce."

== Ingredients ==
The sauces are varied; some can be tomato-based and may contain vinegar, brown sugar, and a blend of spices. Others contain no tomato and are solely seasoning-based. It uses hamburger and contains no large chunks of meat. Some use Sloppy Joe as the sauce. In addition to the sauce, the hot dog may be topped with onions and yellow mustard. Unlike Cincinnati-style coneys, no cheese is used as a hot dog topping. In many instances, customers can order their dogs with onions under the meat; the term for this is ordering the dog "buried".

== See also ==
- List of hot dogs
- List of regional dishes of the United States
- List of sausage dishes
- Coney Island hot dog
