= Ketwurst =

Kind of hot dog

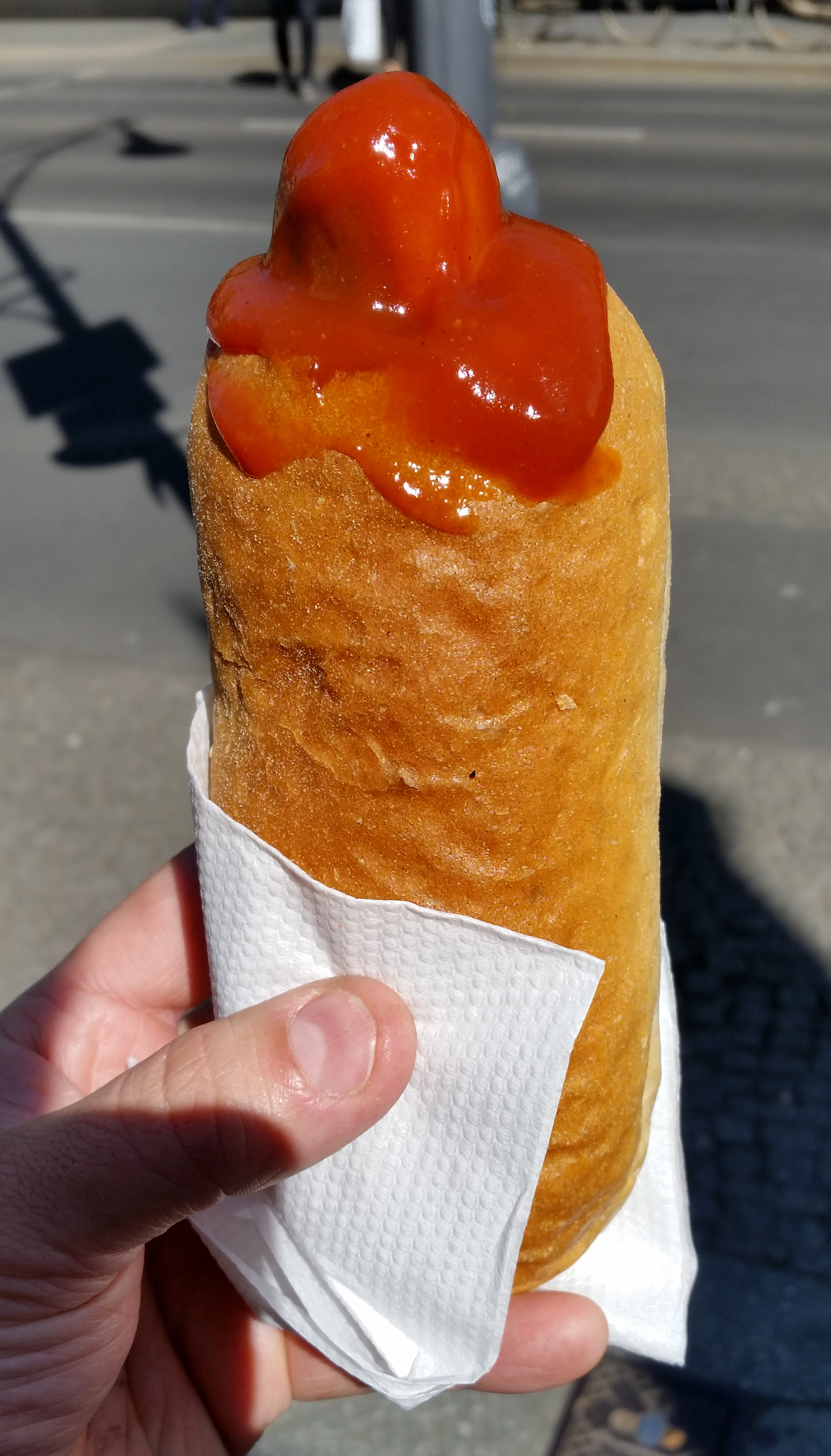
- Type: Hot dog
- Place of origin: East Germany
- Main ingredients: Bread roll, bockwurst, ketchup

The ketwurst is a form of hot dog originated from the German Democratic Republic (East Germany). The word "ketwurst" comes from a combination of Ketchup and Wurst (German for "sausage").

Its preparation involves the heating of a special Bockwurst, larger than regular hot dogs, in water. A long roll is pierced by a hot metal cylinder, which creates an appropriately sized hole. The sausage is then dunked in ketchup and put inside of the roll.

The Ketwurst was invented at the State Gastronomical Research Center — like the Grilletta, a hamburger-like meatball-in-a-bun — around 1977–1978. At that time, restaurants at the Berlin TV Tower were incapable of handling the large numbers of visitors, so a take-away food was needed. It is often considered the archetypical East German fast food, but until German reunification, it was rarely seen outside the city center of Berlin.

== See also ==
- List of hot dogs
