= G&W =

G&W may refer to:

- Game & Watch, handheld electronic games produced by Nintendo
- Genesee and Wyoming Railroad
- Genesee & Wyoming
- Grote & Weigel, American meat company
- Gulf+Western
