= Bagel dog =

Sausage snack food

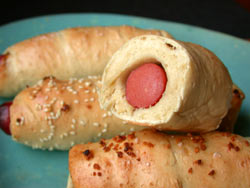
- Cross section of a bagel dog
- Type: Hot dog
- Place of origin: United States
- Main ingredients: Bagel or bagel-like bread, hot dog

A bagel dog is a food item consisting of a full-size or miniature hot dog wrapped in bagel-style breading before or after cooking. They are similar in concept to a corn dog or pigs in a blanket. Bagel dogs are commonly available for purchase at prepared-food concession stands and frozen in grocery stores in the greater New York City, Chicago, and Cincinnati areas, but are more difficult to find elsewhere. Some bagel dogs are prepared using an actual bagel to wrap around the hot dog, rather than a bagel-like breading.

Preparation can include: boiling a hot dog, wrapping it in bagel dough, topping it with poppy seeds or sesame seeds, and then baking the whole product to cook the dough.

== History ==
It has been said that the bagel dog was invented by Milan R. Burger in Durham, North Carolina in 1980. Burger and his baker wife Sandra T. were co-owners of Temptee Bagel at the time they developed their bagel dog, and the name "Bagel Original Dog" was trademarked. However, other trademarks existed before Burger's, including Roger Pavlow, who appears to have registered the first trademark for "Bagel Dog" in 1978.

In 1987, it was reported that the brand "Bernie's East Bagel Dogs", consisting of 7-inch wieners wrapped in plain dough or flavored by onions or sesame, were available in 85% of New York supermarkets.

== See also ==
- List of hot dogs
- List of sausage dishes
