= Carolina style =

Hot dog condiment combination associated with North Carolina

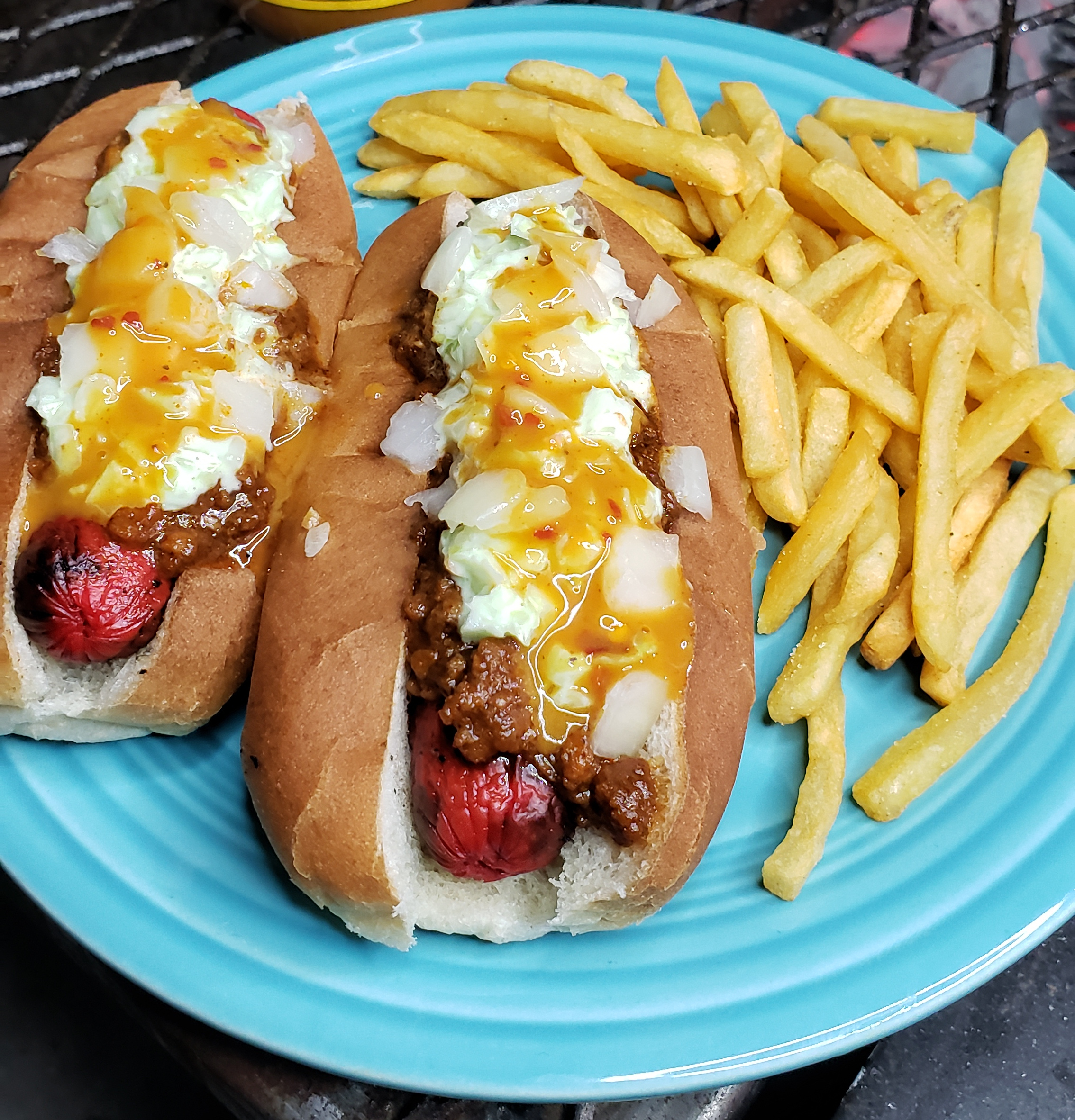
- Type: Condiments
- Place of origin: United States
- Region or state: North Carolina, South Carolina
- Main ingredients: Chili, cole slaw, onions

Carolina style refers to an established set of condiments for hot dogs and hamburgers, originating in the Coastal Plain and Piedmont regions of North Carolina and South Carolina. The classic combination is chili, slaw and onions; locally, mustard sometimes replaces slaw, or is added as a fourth item.

The designation "Carolina style" has become increasingly recognized outside of the Carolinas: for example, the restaurant chain Wendy's from time to time has offered a "Carolina Classic" option on its hamburger menu.
