= Grote & Weigel =

Grote & Weigel, Inc.
- Company type: Private
- Industry: Food processing
- Founded: 1890
- Headquarters: Bloomfield, CT, United States
- Key people: Michael Greiner, President
- Products: Hot dogs, sausages and deli items
- Owner: Rachael's Food Corporation
- Number of employees: 35

Grote & Weigel, Inc. is a meat company based in Bloomfield, Connecticut, United States. They are one of the oldest meat companies in the United States, having been founded in 1890 in nearby Rockville. They later moved to Hartford, and in 1966 moved to Bloomfield.

On January 27, 2012, it was announced that Grote & Weigel was closing its doors and going out of business. They had supplied a famous 2-foot hot dog to Doogie's of Newington, CT.

On February 22, 2012, Rachael's Food Corp responded to an auctioneer's ad and negotiated a deal to purchase the company. Most of Grote & Weigel's long-time customers, including Big Y Supermarkets, and Sam's Club continue to use the supplier.

In 2019, the production continued as Mitty's Food acquired the company.

== Products and distribution ==
Best known for various types of Hot Dogs, the company also produces other types of sausage such as Bratwurst, Cajun Andouille, Italian Sausage, and Kielbasa as well as luncheon meats including Bologna, Ham, Liverwurst, and cooked Salami. The firm J.Polep is a distributor.
