= Bockwurst =

German sausage

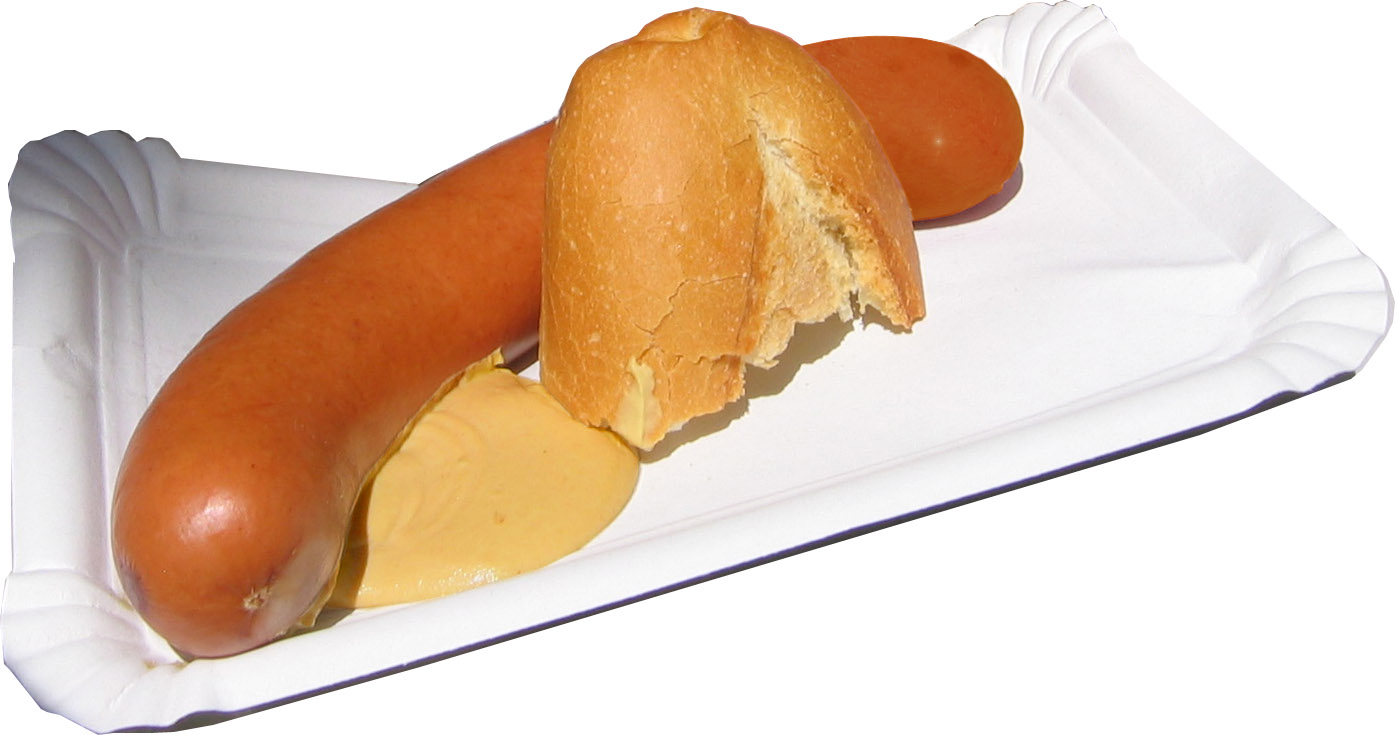
Bockwurst

Bockwurst (German pronunciation: [ˈbɔkˌvʊʁst]) is a German sausage traditionally made from ground pork or veal (tending more towards veal, unlike bratwurst). Bockwurst is flavored with salt, white pepper and paprika. Other herbs, such as marjoram, chives, parsley, ginger, mace and coriander, are also often added.

Bockwurst is a parboiled sausage that is smoked in hot smoke for around 30 to 60 minutes before cooking. This gives it its characteristic brownish colour.

Bockwurst was originally eaten with bock beer. In Bavaria and Berlin it was sold during the bock beer season. Nowadays, it can be bought all year round almost everywhere in Germany in butcher's shops, take-outs, snack bars, food booths, many bakeries and gas stations.

As a natural casing sausage, it is usually cooked by simmering or steaming although it may also be grilled. Boiling is avoided as the casing may split open and the bockwurst may look unappetizing and loses flavor to the cooking water.

A usual portion consists of one bockwurst with mustard and a bread roll or potato salad on a plate. Sometimes, however, the bockwurst is served directly in the bread roll and covered with mustard. In some regions of Germany potato soup is served with bockwurst.

Bockwursts made in America, also from veal and pork, bear more resemblance to the Bavarian Weisswurst in color and taste, although parsley is rarely used in this version.

== History ==
The "Bockwurst" was first mentioned in Bavaria in 1827 as a name for sausages that were prepared and consumed during the Bock beer season. In his Bavarian dictionary published in 1827, Johann Andreas Schmeller called Bock beer with bockwurst a "popular breakfast from old Munich". Nevertheless, an urban legend in Berlin claims that it was invented in 1889 by restaurant owner R. Scholtz of Berlin.

== See also ==
- List of pork dishes
- List of sausages
- List of smoked foods
- List of veal dishes
