= Hot dog bun =

Type of soft bun designed to hold a sausage

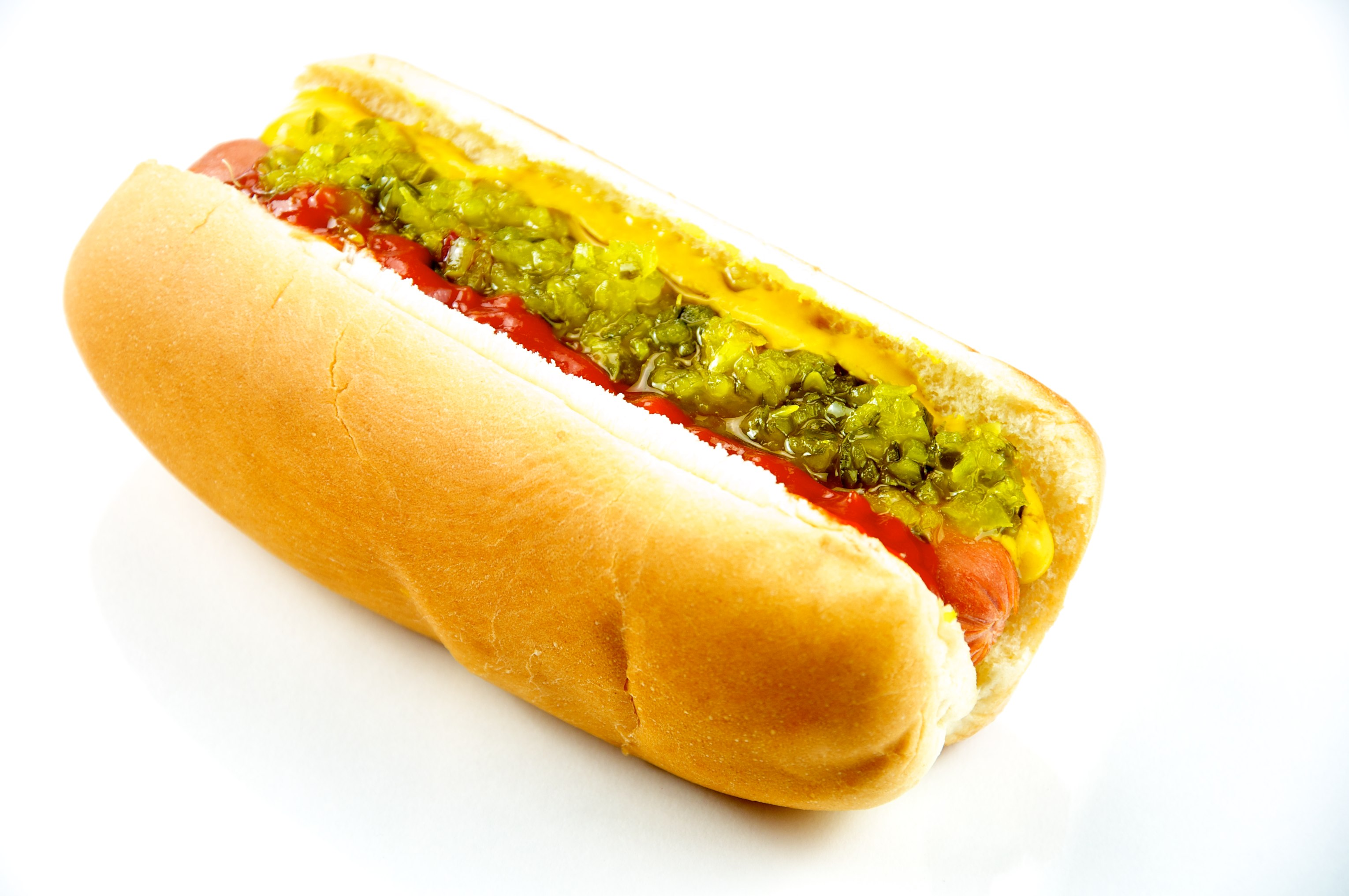
- A hot dog bun of the side-loading variety containing a hot dog sausage dressed with three common condiments: ketchup, relish, and mustard
- Alternative names: Side-loading bun
- Type: Bun
- Place of origin: United States
- Main ingredients: Flour, water
- Variations: New England–style hot dog bun

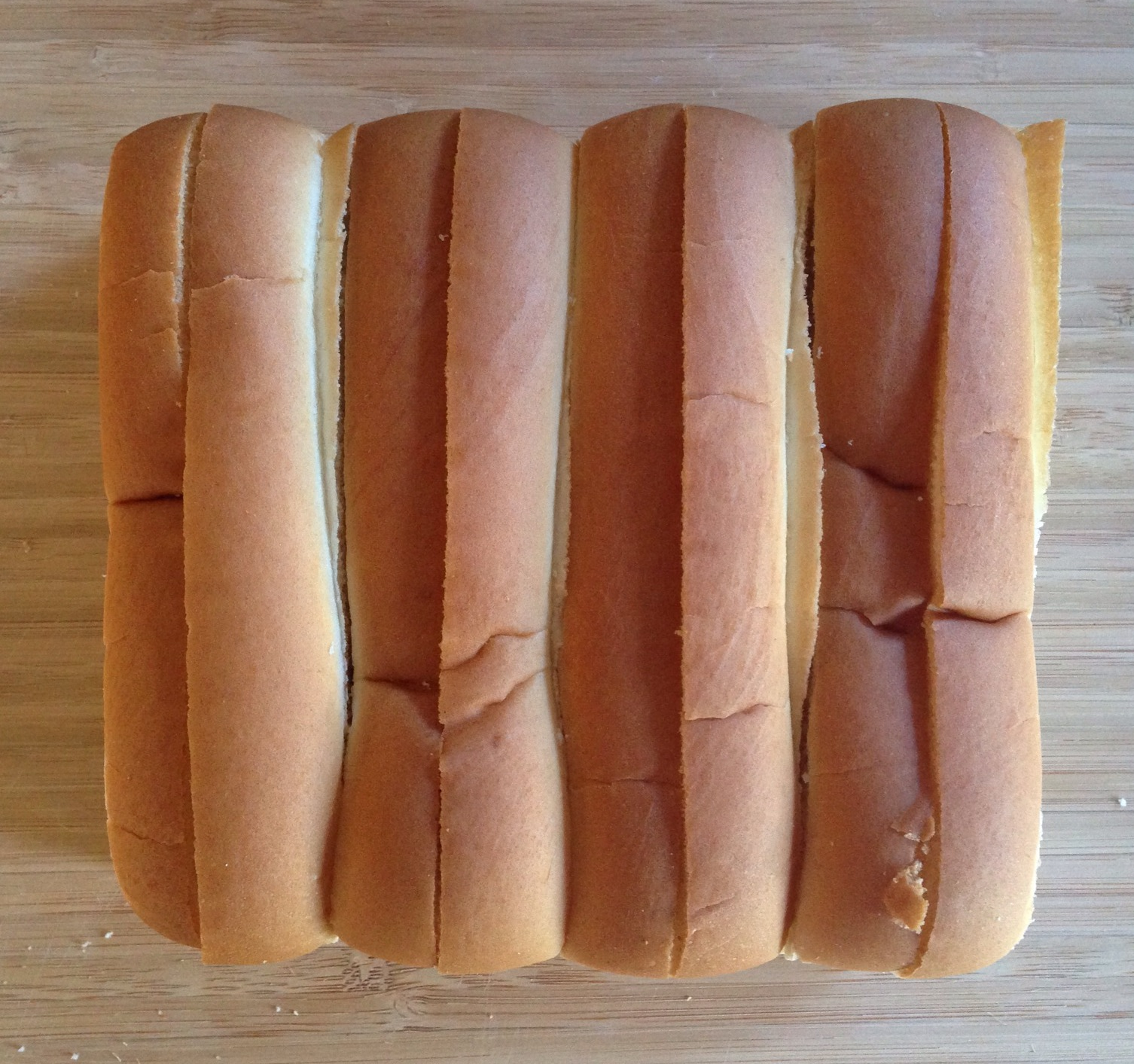
New England–style hot dog buns

A hot dog bun or hot dog roll is a type of soft bun (bread roll) shaped specifically to contain a hot dog or another type of sausage.

The side-loading bun is common in most of the United States, while the top-loading New England–style hot dog bun is popular in that region. Other regional variations include the addition of poppy seeds to the buns of Chicago-style hot dogs.

== History ==
Hot dog historian and professor emeritus at Roosevelt University Bruce Kraig believes the term "hot dog" was invented in the late 19th century by American observers of German immigrants, who ate sausages on buns. The Americans joked that the sausages looked suspiciously like the Germans' dachshunds.

Charles Feltman invented an elongated hot dog bun on Coney Island in 1871 according to writer Jefferey Stanton.

According to an obituary of Austrian immigrant baker Ignatz Frischmann published in 1904, the "Vienna roll" supplied to Coney Island hot dog vendors was invented by Frischmann and made him a rich man sometime before his death.

At the 1904 Louisiana Purchase Exposition, in St. Louis, Missouri, a German concessionaire, Antoine Feuchtwanger, served hot sausages called "frankfurters", after his birthplace, Frankfurt, in Hesse. At first he loaned gloves for his customers to hold his sausages. When many were not returned, he asked his brother, who was a baker, to invent a solution. Thus, the hot dog bun was born.

== Regional variations ==
In Chicago, Illinois, where poppy-seed buns are popularly served with Chicago-style hot dogs, the buns are made with high-gluten flour to hold up to steaming.

In Austria, Poland, and throughout Central Europe a "hot dog" is a baguette which is hollowed out by cutting off the end and impaling it on a spike so a sausage can be inserted. In Denmark this variation is known as a "French Hot Dog" because of the use of baguette, and a "French Hot Dog Dressing" which contains Dijon mustard. Specially prepared baguettes are made for this popular food.

=== New England–style hot dog bun ===
New England–style hot dog bun
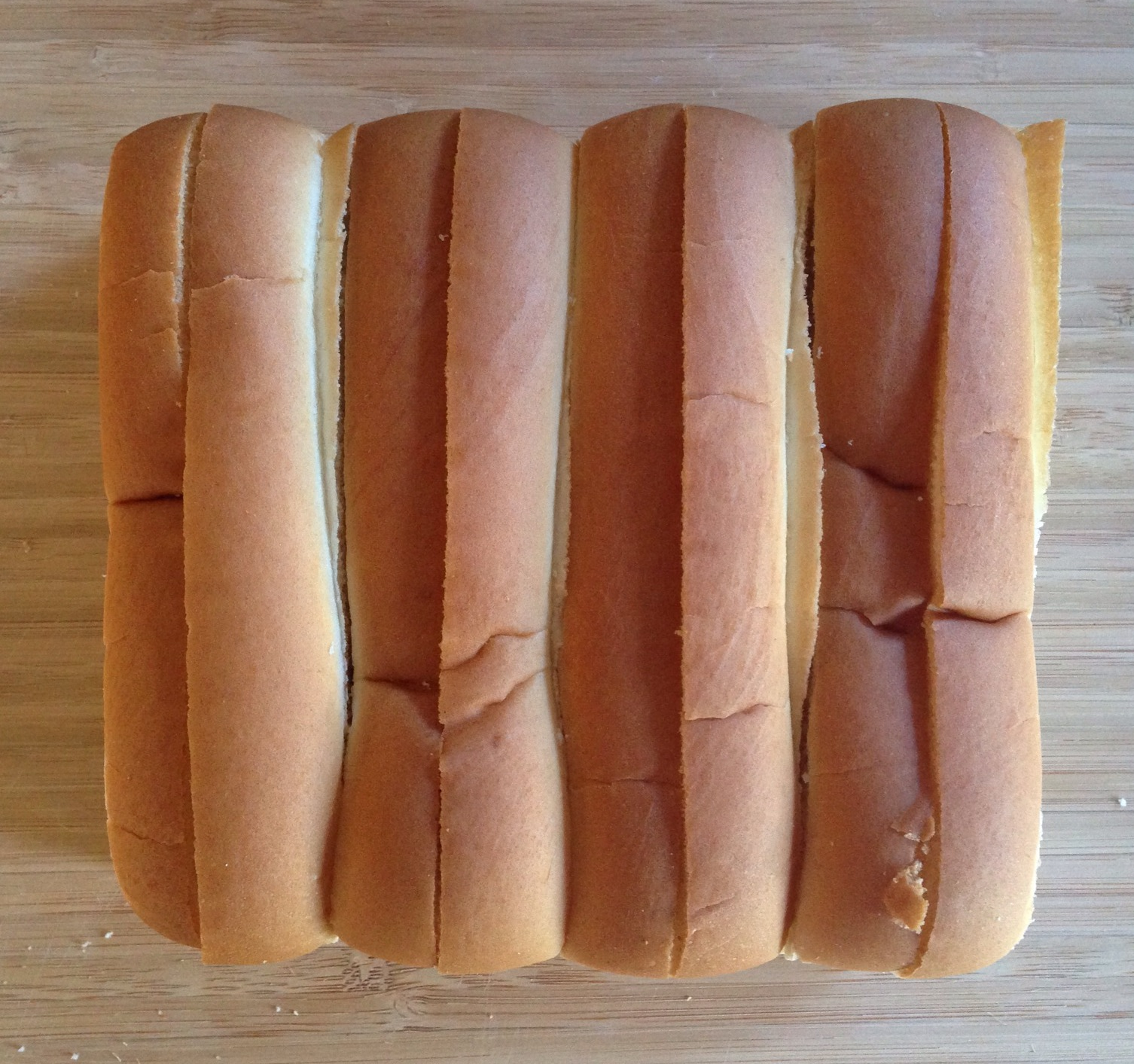
- Alternative names: New England bun, New England roll, split-top roll, top-loading bun
- Type: Bread roll
- Place of origin: United States
- Region or state: New England
- Created by: Howard Johnson's
- Invented: 1940s
- Main ingredients: Potato flakes, dry milk, egg, wheat

New England–style hot dog buns, also often known as New England hot dog buns or top-loading hot dog buns, are the hot dog buns most commonly used in the United States region of New England and its cuisine. They may also be called split-top, top-sliced, frankfurter rolls, or frankfurt rolls.

==== History ====
This style of roll or bun was developed in the 1940s by Howard Johnson's, who approached the Maine bakery J. J. Nissen in search of a bun for its fried clam strip sandwich. According to The Boston Globe, the "restaurant chain wanted top sliced rolls that would stand upright and be easier to prepare, serve, and eat." Outside of New England, they are associated with clam rolls and lobster rolls, dishes iconic to New England cuisine.

Today, this style of bun is prevalent in New England, with small and large grocery stores stocking at least several competing brands, and the hot dog bun typical of the rest of the United States (also called a "side-loading" bun) offered right alongside.

==== Overview ====
In New England, hot dogs, clam rolls, lobster rolls, and the buns that accompany them are often associated with the summer months and coastal villages, where clam shacks and lobstering are common. Some recipes for these dishes explicitly require the use of a New England–style bun.

The rolls are baked very close together, keeping the sides soft, much like sliced bread. This makes them amenable to buttering, toasting and grilling.

Grocers in localities with significant tourism from New Englanders, such as some markets in Florida, will sell New England–style buns to satisfy visitors.

==== Outside the US ====
The Norwegian retail chain Coop introduced top-loading hot dog buns in 2019, arguing that the buns helped to keep the hot dog and its toppings upright. Even though Norway has a significant hot dog market, with approximately 500 million hot dogs sold annually in a country of 5 million people, top-loading hot dog buns failed to make significant inroads into the Norwegian market. Only four years after being introduced they were discontinued following negative feedback from customers.

== See also ==
- List of buns
