= Industrial Cafe and Saloon =

Defunct restaurant in Portland, Oregon, U.S.

- Interactive map of Industrial Cafe and Saloon

Restaurant information
- Owners: Mary Starr; Russ Hubbard
- Food type: American
- Location: 2572 NW Vaughn Street, Portland, Multnomah, Oregon, 97210, United States
- Coordinates: 45°32′12″N 122°42′15″W

Industrial Cafe and Saloon was a restaurant in Portland, Oregon. Guy Fieri visited the restaurant for an episode of the Food Network's Diners, Drive-Ins and Dives.

== Description ==
Industrial Cafe and Saloon operated in the ground floor of a condominium in northwest Portland's Northwest District. Willamette Week said the interior had a full bar and a "chic concrete-and-exposed-pipes aesthetic" with metal furnishings. The small restaurant was reportedly "made up of 95% reclaimed industrial materials", and raised pasture-fed cattle on the owner's private ranch in St. Helens.

The American menu included burgers, grits, smoked chicken wings, Hawaiian-style beef ribs, a Reuben sandwich, fritters, salmon cakes, pan-fried chicken breast with spicy bread crumbs, and comfort foods like biscuits and gravy, chicken pot pie, a muffuletta sandwich, and macaroni and cheese. The grass-fed burger was served with bacon, fried egg, guacamole, or deep-fried jalapeños. Salad options included Caesar with chicken, salmon or bay shrimp, as well as a spinach variety with hard-cider vinaigrette.

The "quirky" brunch menu included breakfast salads, egg-and meat entrees, pancakes, and fritters. The Gears and Gravy had two buttermilk biscuits with pork sausage gravy and sage; the restaurant also had a mushroom rosemary vegetarian option. The dessert menu included Ms. Margaret's chocolate-chip bundt cake topped with whipped cream, a tribute to the cook's neighbor from North Dakota.

== History ==
Industrial was owned by Mary Starr and Russ Hubbard.

Guy Fieri visited the restaurant for an episode of the Food Network's Diners, Drive-Ins and Dives.

== Reception ==
Drew Tyson called Industrial a brunch destination in Thrillist's 2014 overview of recommended eateries for the Alphabet District. Julie Lee included the business in 1859 Oregon's Magazine's overview of Portland's best biscuits and gravy in 2017. Eater Portland included Industrial in a 2017 list of the city's 18 "hidden gem" restaurants.

== See also ==
- List of Diners, Drive-Ins and Dives episodes
