= List of sausage dishes =

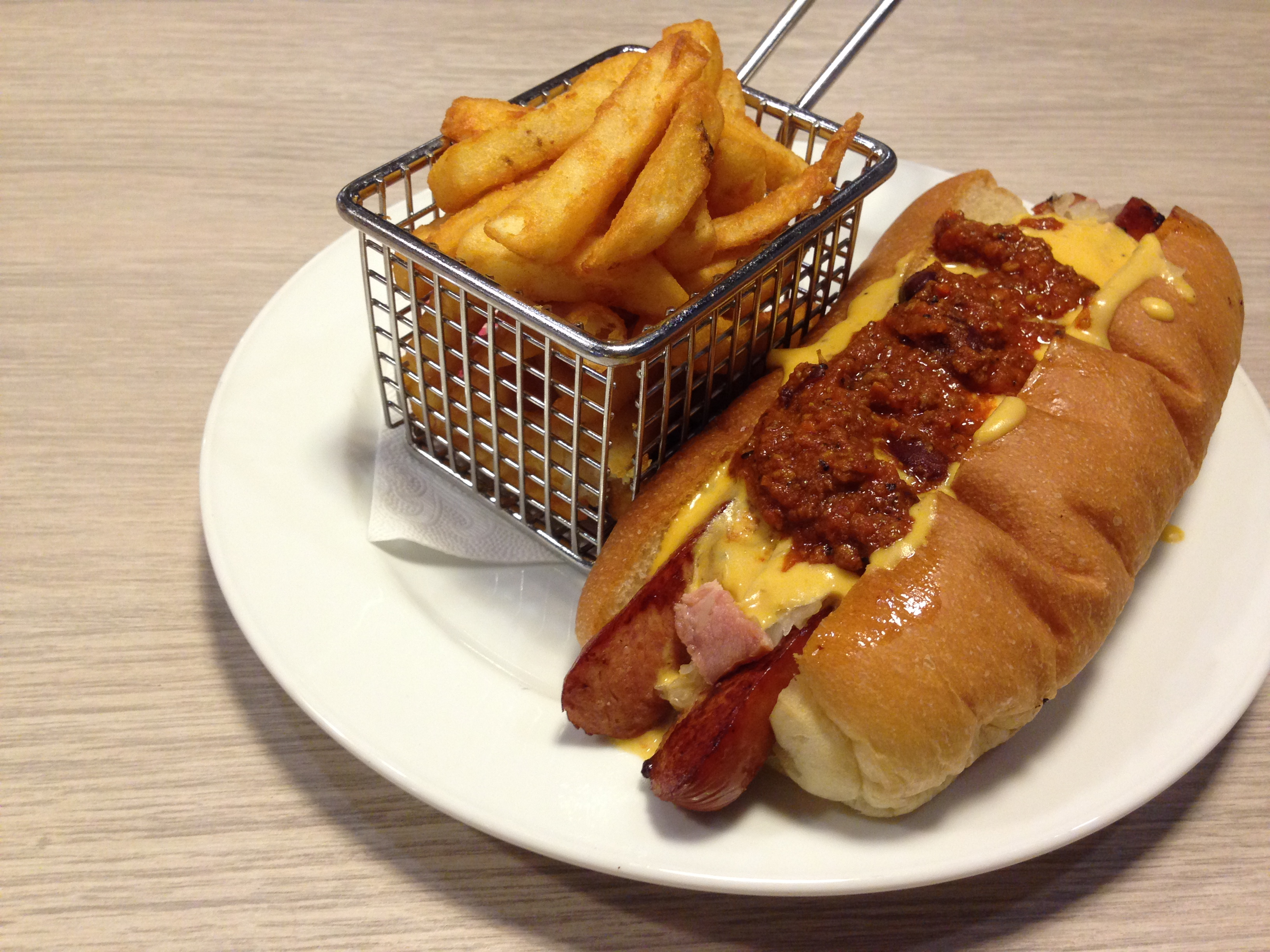
A chili dog with fries

This is a list of notable sausage dishes, in which sausage is used as a primary ingredient or as a significant component of a dish.

== Sausage dishes ==
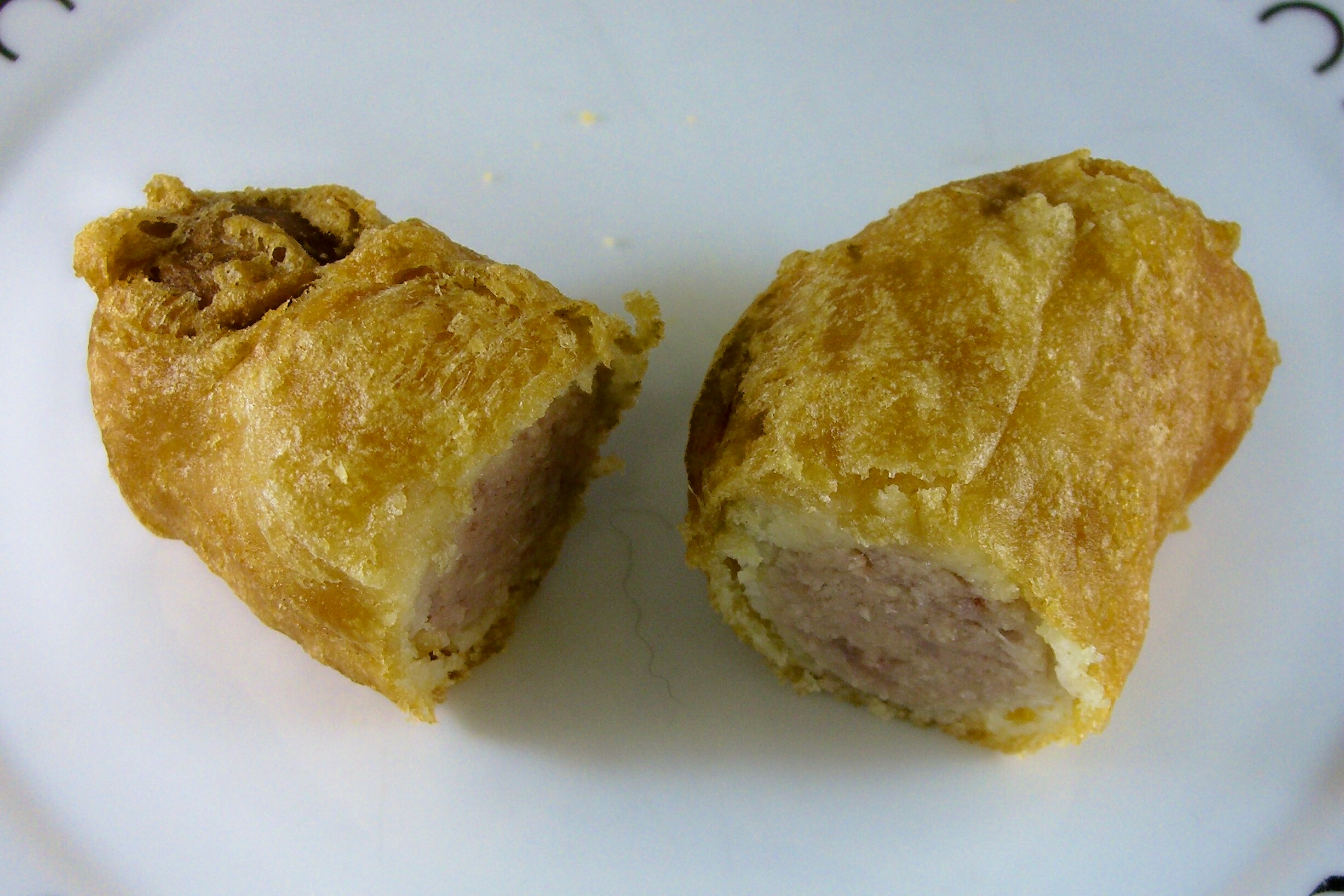
Battered sausage

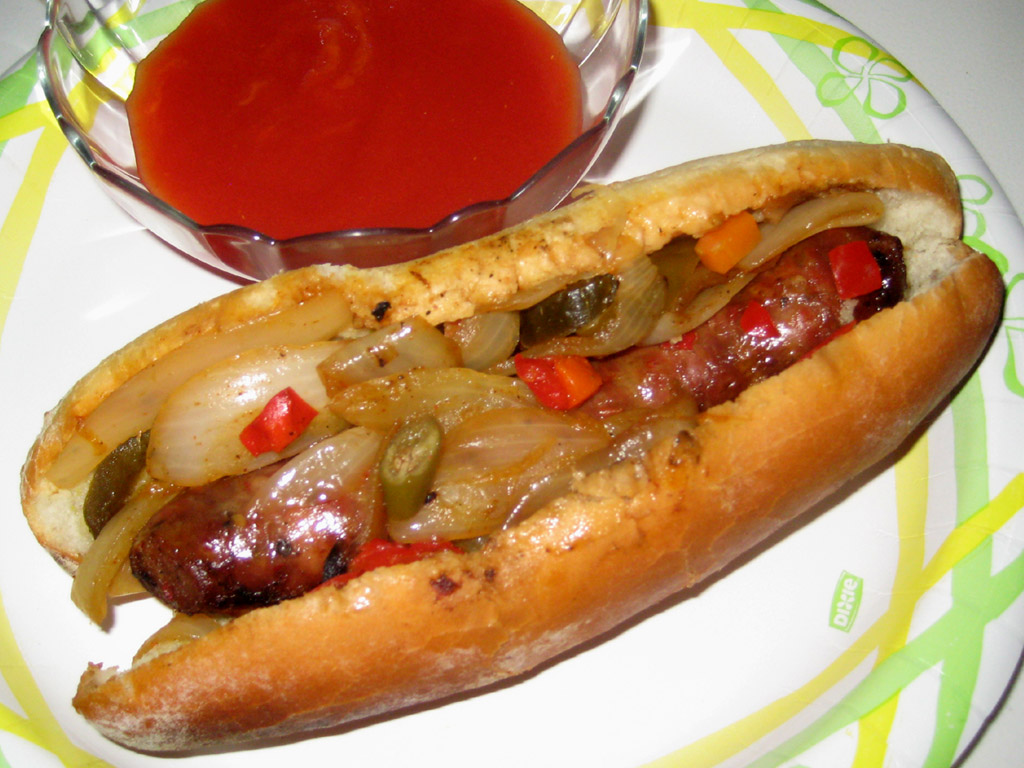
An Italian sausage sandwich

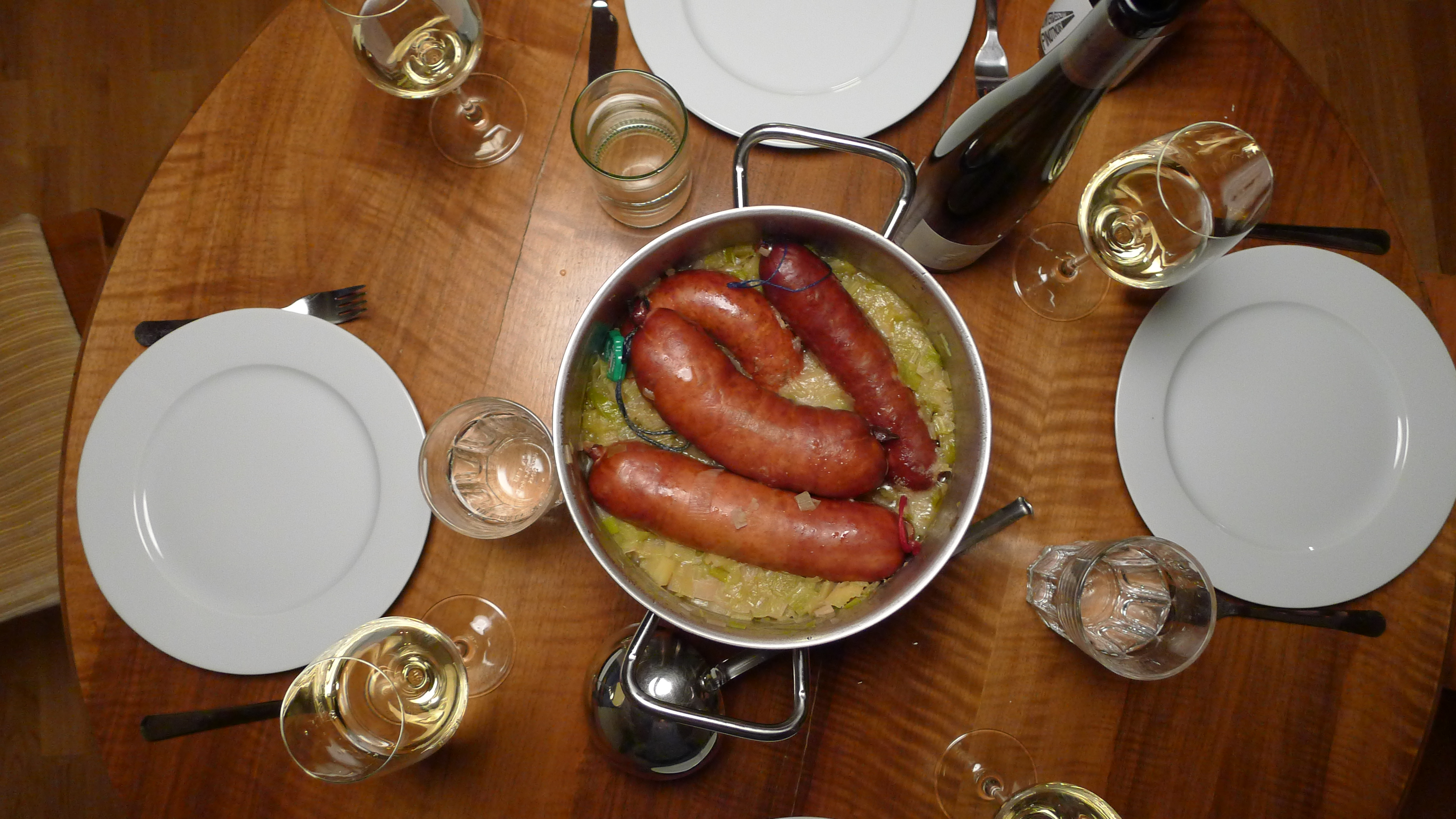
Papet Vaudois

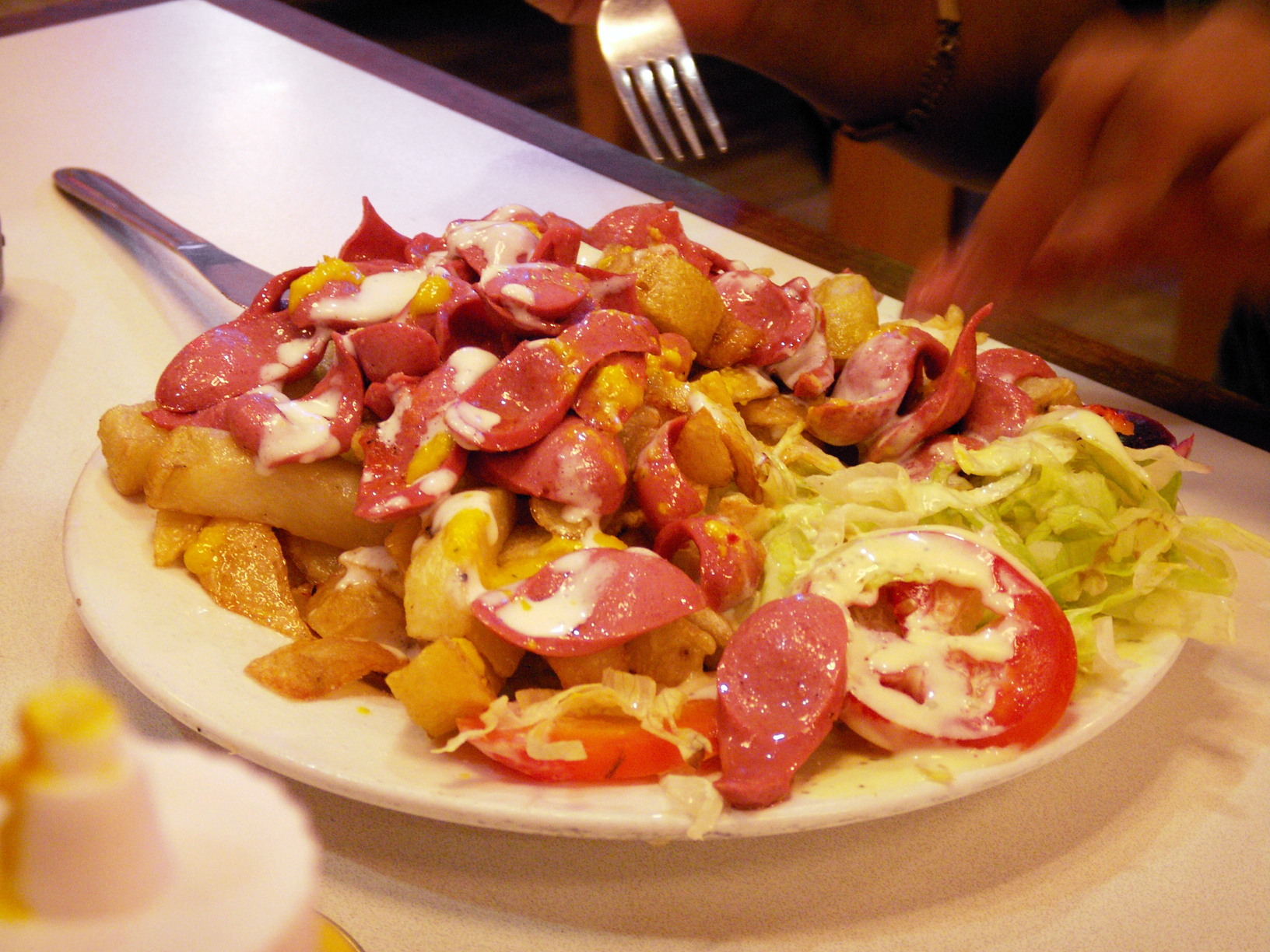
Salchipapas is a fast food dish commonly consumed as street food throughout Latin America.

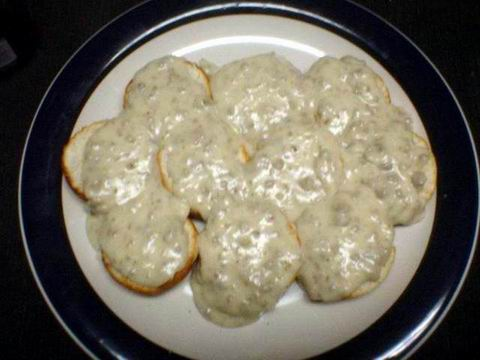
Sausage gravy served atop biscuits, an example of a biscuits and gravy dish

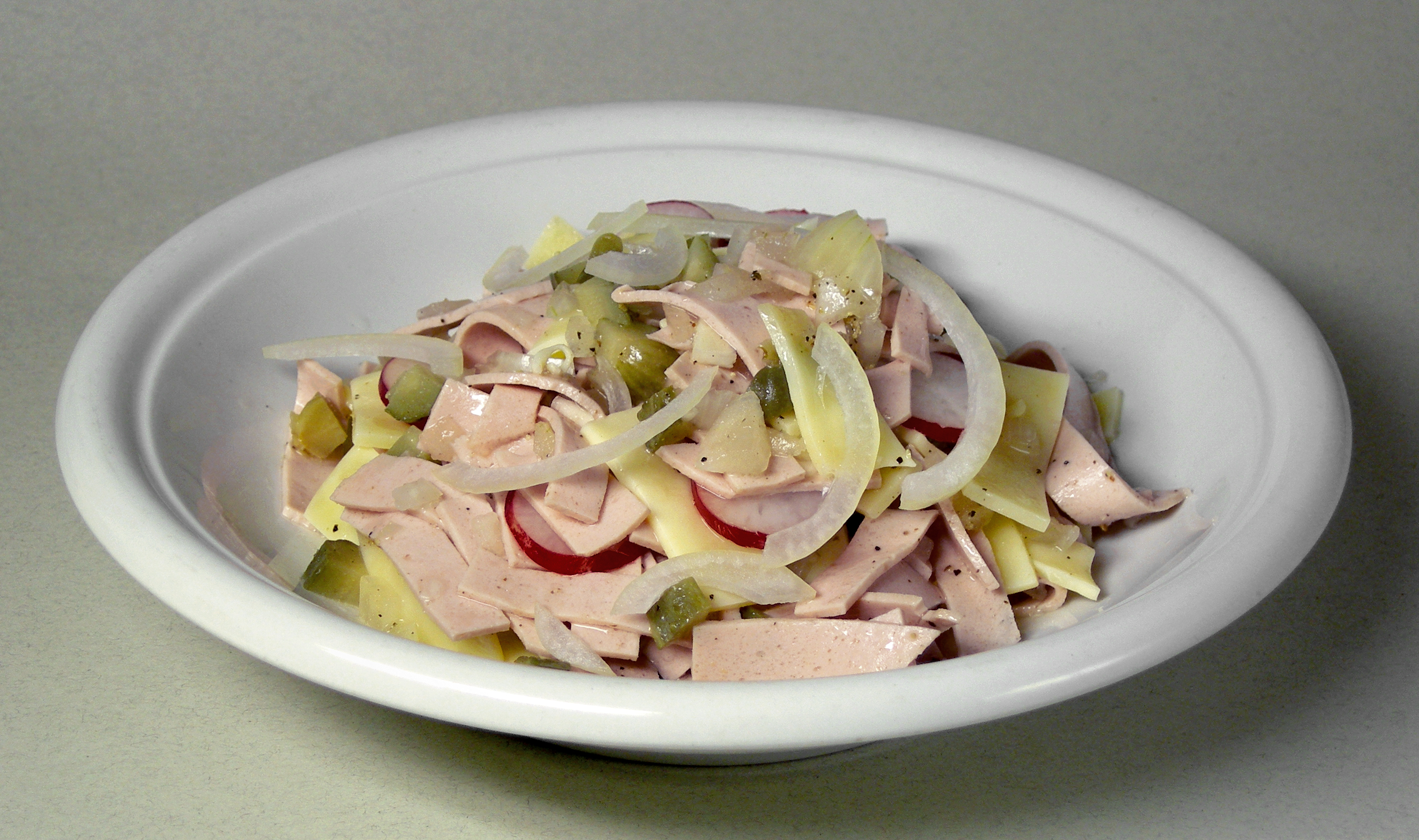
Wurstsalat

- Bacon Explosion – American pork dish
- Bagel dog – Sausage snack food
- Bangers and mash – Dish of sausages and mashed potato
- Barbecue bologna – Barbecue dish from Oklahoma
- Battered sausage – Savoury fried meat dish from Britain
- Bigos – Polish dish of meat and sauerkraut
- Boliche – Stuffed pot roast from Cuban cuisine
- Bologna cake – Savory cake from the Southern United States
- Botifarra – Catalan sausage dish
- Cassoulet – Slow-cooked stew containing meat and white beans
- Cheese dog – Hot dog with cheese filling
- Chicken bog – Lowcountry chicken pilaf
- Chili dog – Hot dog with chili
- Choripán – Sausage-filled Latin American sandwich
- Chorrillana – Chilean dish
- Coddle – Irish stew with no fixed recipe, built around boiled sausages
- Corn dog – Deep-fried, corn-battered hot dog on a stick
- Cozido – Dish made of various meats and vegetables of Spanish and Portuguese origins
- Currywurst – Fast food dish of German origin
- Fasole cu cârnaţi – Romanian dish
- Frikandel – Deep fried meat snack
- Galette – French flat cake, pancake or pastry
- Galette-saucisse – French street food
- Gumbo – Louisianan stew
- Helzel – Ashkenazi Jewish dish
- Hot dago – American sandwich
- Hot dog variations – Ways to serve the "hot dog" style of sausage from around the world
- Jambalaya – Rice dish with meat and vegetables
- Klobasnek – American Czech savory food
- Ketwurst – Kind of hot dog
- Kuumakoira - Kind of hot dog
- Linsen mit Spätzle – Swabian dish of egg noodles, lentils, and wiener sausages
- Makkaraperunat – Finnish street food of sausage and French fries
- Maxwell Street Polish – Sausage sandwich from Chicago
- Michigan hot dog – Style of hot dog
- Olivier salad – Russian traditional dish
- Papet Vaudois – Swiss potato and leek dish with sausages
- Pasulj – Bean stew or soup
- Pepperoni roll – Italian-American dish
- Pigs in a blanket – Sausage wrapped in pastry
- Polish Boy – Sausage sandwich
- Port sausage – Iranian dish
- Pringá – Andalusian meat dish
- Qazy – Horsemeat sausages
- Ragù alla salsiccia – Variety of ragù
- Red beans and rice – Dish characteristic of Louisiana Creole cuisine
- Sai krok pla naem – Traditional Thai dish
- Salchipapas – Latin American street food
- Sausage and peppers – Italian-American dish
- Sausage bread – American savory dish
- Sausage bun – Sausage wrapped in pastry
- Sausage gravy – Breakfast dish from the Southern United States
- Sausage roll – Savoury pastry snack
- Sausage sandwich – Sandwich containing cooked sausage
- Siskonmakkara – Finnish fresh sausage
- Small sausage in large sausage – Taiwanese snack sandwich
- Toad in the hole – Traditional English dish
- Wurstsalat – German sausage salad

== See also ==
- List of hot dogs
- List of sausages
- List of pork dishes
- List of smoked foods
- List of bacon dishes
