= Sosis Bandari =

Iranian dish

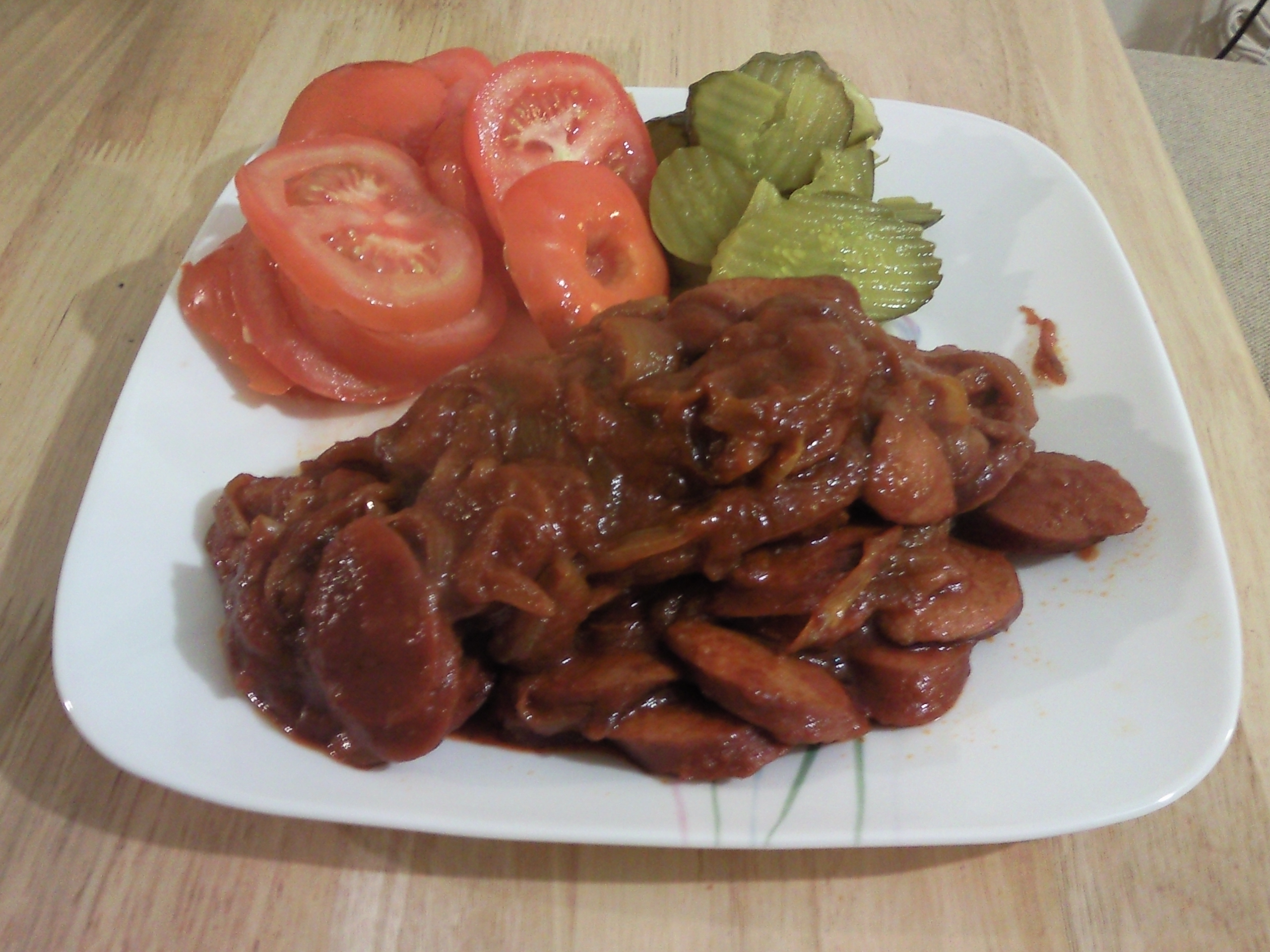
- Home-made sausage (Sosis Bandari) with sliced tomato and kosher dills
- Alternative names: سوسیس بندری
- Type: Sandwich, Fast Food
- Course: First or main (optional)
- Place of origin: Iran
- Region or state: Southern Iran
- Main ingredients: Sausage, tomato, onion, tomato paste, spices

Sosis Bandari (Persian: سوسیس بندری, translated as. Port sausage) is an Iranian fast-food or street food, usually served in sandwich shops in Iran in the form of a sub or meal. It contains sausage, onion, tomato paste, ground chilli pepper and other spices. According to the Dehkhoda Dictionary of the Persian language, it is a very hot and spicy sausage dish common in Khuzestan province.

== History ==
From 1514 to 1614 the Portuguese controlled the south ports, mainly the port they named Comorão. For a hundred years the Portuguese controlled this port as a middle point for spice trading. Sosis bandari is likely derived from the Portuguese sausage but given the locals were Muslim, they made it with either lamb or other meats not considered haram giving birth to sosis bandari. That also brought spices from Indian subcontinent and why a lot of dishes in Southern Iran are spicy in comparison to Northern Iran.

== Etymology ==
The word "bandar" means port and "bandari" means from the port. While there are many ports in Iran, the word is usually used to refer to southern Iranian port cities and towns of the Persian Gulf. Sosis Bandari means sausage from the port or port-style sausage. This part of Iran's cuisine is usually spicy.

== Ingredients ==
The main ingredients include sliced sausage, sliced onions, tomato paste, and ground chilli. Optional ingredients may include turmeric, chopped green pepper and lime juice. The sausages usually used for this dish taste like Polish kielbasa, smoked sausage and hot dog.

== Serving and use ==
Port sausage is a hot thick stew, usually used as a filling for submarine or baguette sandwiches. When used as a meal, it is usually served with submarine or baguette bread, sliced kosher dills and sliced tomatoes. Medium- and lower-class fast food, street stands or sandwich shops in Iran usually have port sausage (sosis bandari) on their menu.

== Popularity ==
Port sausage is very popular among high school and college students in Iran, as it is usually very cheap and inexpensive. While famous for being cheap and prepared from low-quality ingredients, the taste and popularity keep people interested after school and college time. It is considered a nostalgic cuisine among Iranian immigrants and can be found in some Persian restaurants outside Iran as well.

== See also ==
- List of sausage dishes
- Makkaraperunat
- Salchipapa
- Currywurst
