= Makkaraperunat =

Street food in Finland

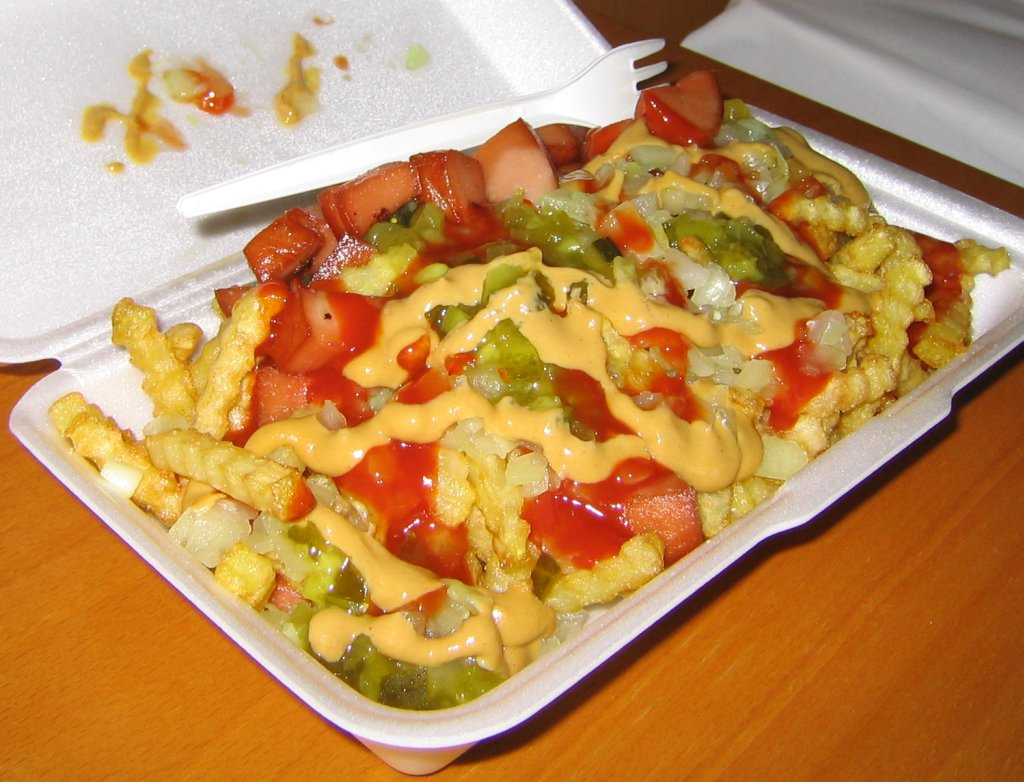
Makkaraperunat with tomato ketchup, mustard, relish and onion.

Makkaraperunat (Finnish for "sausage potatoes") is a street food dish popular in Finland and elsewhere. The dish consists of French fries and slices of sausage, which can be deep-fried in fat or baked in an oven, and is served with condiments.

The amount of condiments in the dish and the quality of the dish depends on the particular street food kiosk. Condiments traditionally used in the dish include mustard, ketchup, onion, garlic, pickle relish, and mayonnaise.

The dish has different nicknames in Finland. A common nickname is makkispekkis. In Jyväskylä, the dish is known as taksari, short for taksimiehen erikoinen ("taxi driver's special"), in Rovaniemi as makkaraherkku ("sausage delight"), and in Kuopio as sitä sun tätä ("this and that").

The dish appears in the Finnish video games My Summer Car and in Last Drop as taksari.

== See also ==
- List of sausage dishes
- Pyttipanna
- Currywurst
- Salchipapa
- Sosis Bandari
