= Papet Vaudois =

Swiss potato and leek dish with sausages

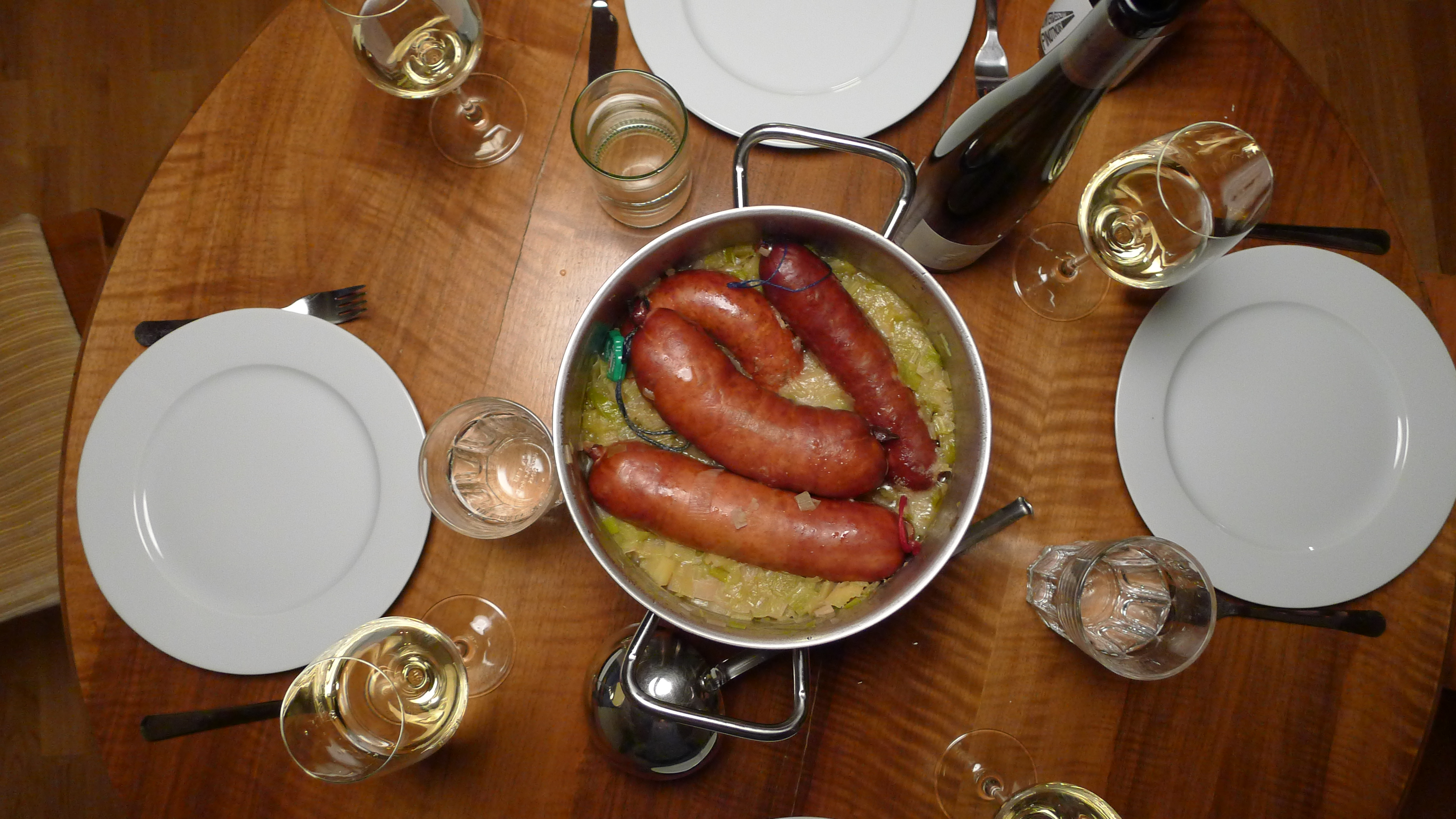
Papet Vaudois served with wine

Papet Vaudois (French: Papet vaudois or simply Papet, "Vaud papet") is a dish originating in the Swiss canton of Vaud. It essentially consists of leeks and potatoes and is accompanied by cabbage sausages. It is often considered to be the national dish of Vaud; the potatoes and leeks happen to have the same colors as the cantonal flag: white and green.

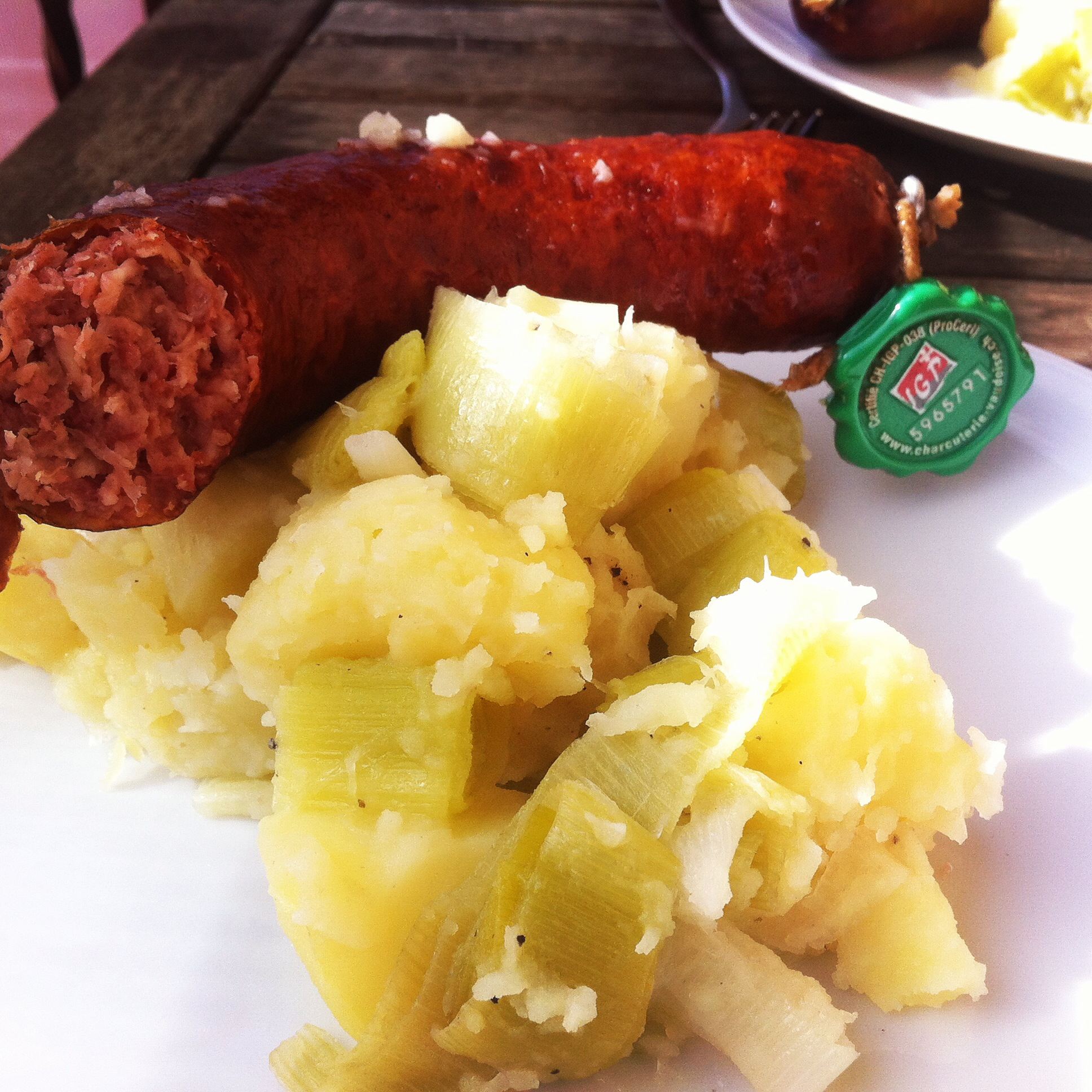
Close-up view of the dish

Papet Vaudois is prepared by boiling potatoes and leeks together, often with cream and white wine. Although typically well cooked until the ingredients achieve a melt-in-the-mouth consistency, leeks and potatoes retain their shapes are not mashed together. Sausages are also cooked together with the potatoes and leeks. Saucisse aux choux (cabbage sausage) or other smoked pork sausages from the canton are typically used. These are cooking sausages that are not meant to be eaten raw.

The French term papet is derived from papette, which means "porridge". It is unknown when the dish was prepared for the first time. It is often served on independence day (which took place on January 24, 1798), but it is probably more recent. Pork meat was relatively expensive until the 19th century, cabbage sausage could therefore not be very widespread. Leeks were also not widely consumed, having a bad reputation.

Papet Vaudois is included in the list of cultural property of the canton as an intangible cultural property. Since 2009, the Vaud butchers' association has organized the Journée du Papet vaudois on the 1st Friday of October.

== See also ==
- Swiss cuisine
- List of sausage dishes
