= Salchipapa =

Latin American street food

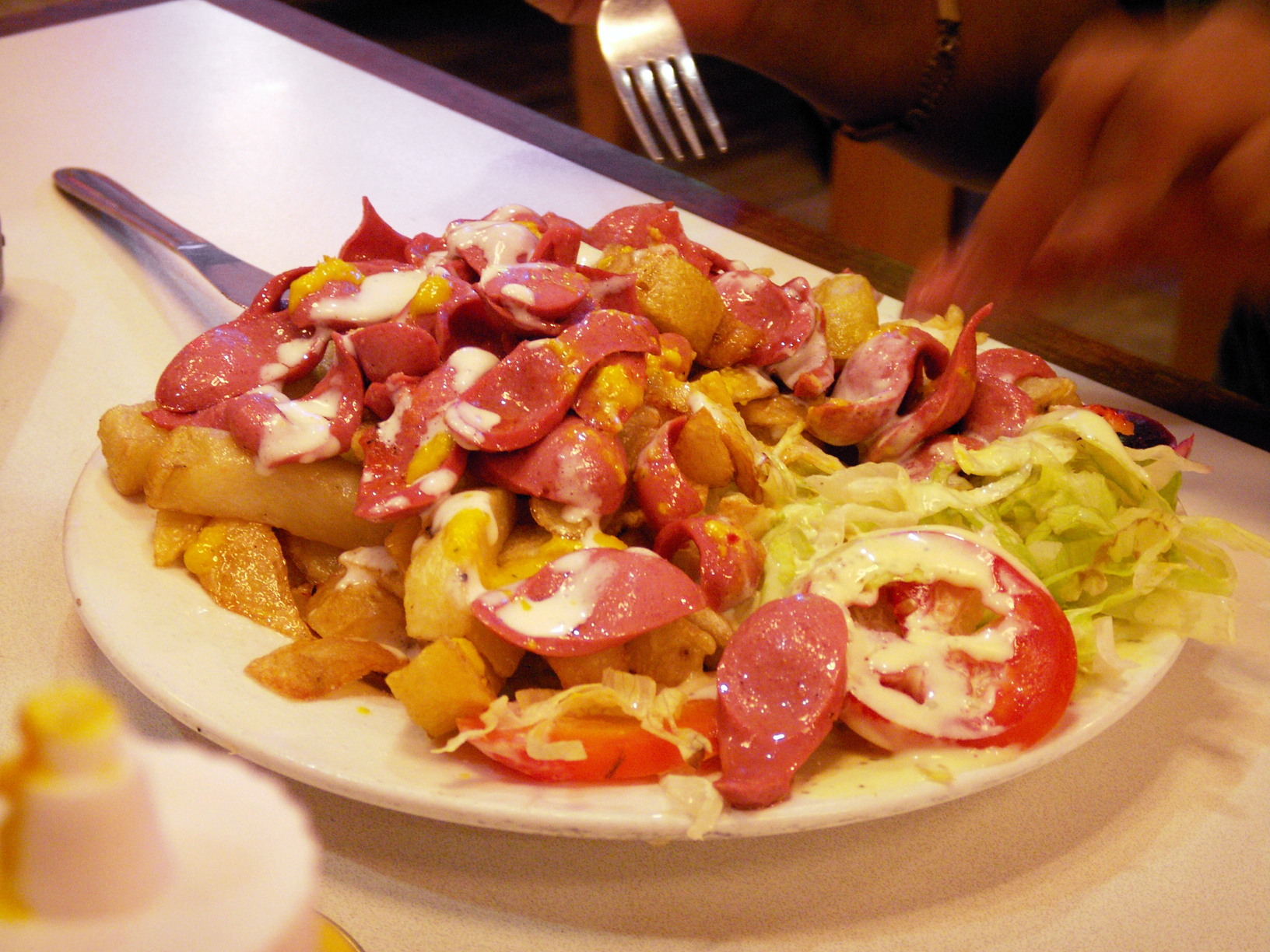
- Type: Fast food
- Main ingredients: French fries, beef sausages, sauce (typically ketchup and mustard), chili peppers

A salchipapa or salchipapas is a South American and Caribbean fast food dish commonly consumed as street food, typically consisting of thinly sliced pan-fried beef sausages and French fries, mixed together with a savory coleslaw on the side. The dish's name is a portmanteau of the Spanish words salchicha (sausage) and papa (potato). The dish is served with different sauces, such as ketchup, mayonnaise and mustard, crema de aceituna (olive sauce), along with aji or chili peppers. Sometimes a fried egg or cheese is added on top; it can also be served with tomato and lettuce, and is occasionally garnished with oregano.

== History ==
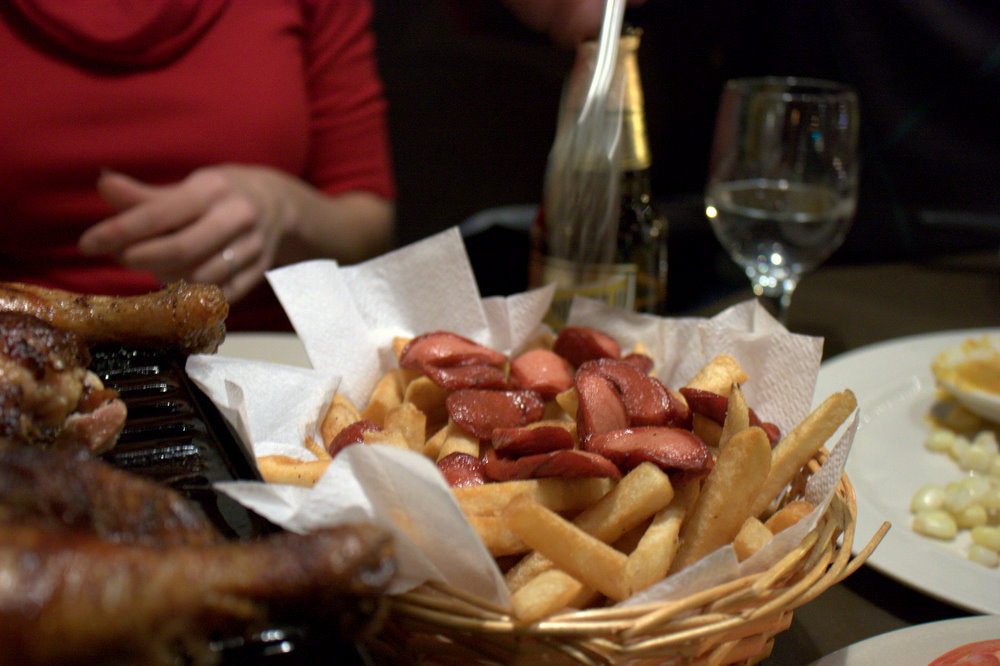
Salchipapa consumption has expanded beyond Peru, and its recipe adopted by various Latin American cuisines.

The salchipapa was invented as a street food in Lima, Peru. Over the years, it expanded to other places in Peru. In Latin America, the dish's popularity has expanded beyond Peruvian cuisine, and is now also typical of Colombian cuisine and Bolivian cuisine. The dish is also sold on Argentinian and Ecuadorian streets and markets.

The range of the dish has expanded due to Bolivian immigration in Argentina and Colombian and Peruvian restaurants in the United States and Chile. There is a variant known as choripapas made with chorizo instead of sausage. They can also be found in Mexico. It is also very similar to the Mexican-American street food known as carne asada fries.

== See also ==
- List of Peruvian dishes
- List of meat and potato dishes
- List of sausage dishes
- Currywurst
- Makkaraperunat
- Sosis Bandari
