= Leek =

Vegetable in the onion family

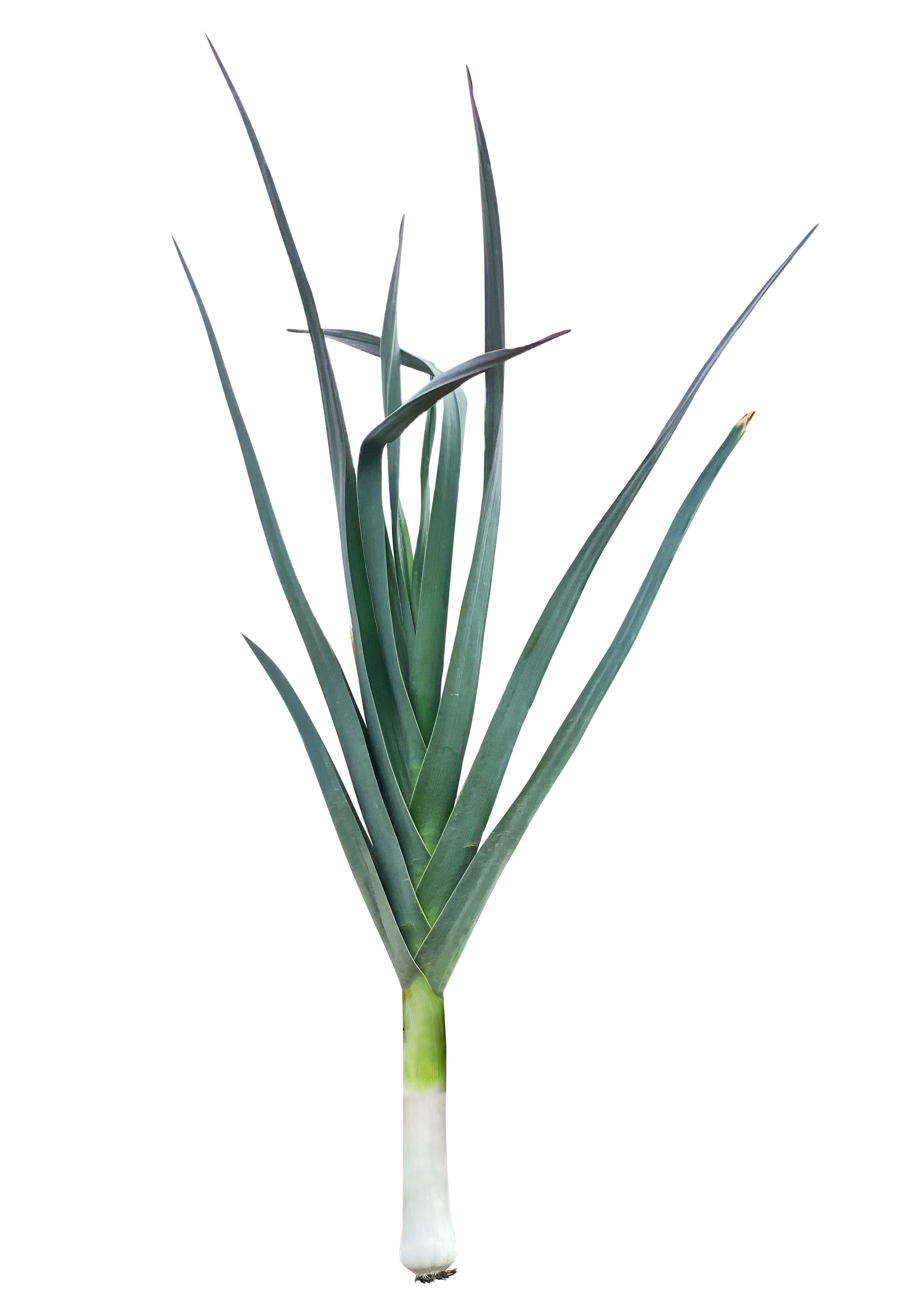
- Genus: Allium
- Species: Allium ampeloprasum L.
- Cultivar group: Leek Group (other names are used, e.g., Porrum Group)
- Cultivar: Many, see text

A leek is a biennial vegetable, a cultivar of Allium ampeloprasum, the broadleaf wild leek (syn. Allium porrum). The edible part of the plant is a bundle of leaf sheaths that is sometimes colloquially called a "stem" or "stalk".

The genus Allium also contains the onion, garlic, shallot, scallion, chives, and Chinese onion. Three closely related vegetables—elephant garlic, kurrat and Persian leek or tareh—are also cultivars of A. ampeloprasum, although different in their culinary uses.

== Etymology ==
Historically, many scientific names were used for leeks, but they are now all treated as cultivars of A. ampeloprasum. The name leek developed from the Old English word lēac, from which the modern English name for garlic also derives. Lēac means 'onion' in Old English and has cognates in other Germanic languages: Danish løg 'onion', Icelandic laukur 'onion', Norwegian løk 'onion', Swedish lök 'onion', German Lauch 'leek', Dutch look 'Allium (any plant of this genus)'.

== Cultivation ==
Leeks must be grown in soil that is loose and drained well; they can be grown in the same regions where onions can be grown. Leeks may be seeded directly, but are more typically sown at high density in seed-beds before being transplanted into the field. This happens at 12 weeks, when they have reached the thickness of a pencil.

The optimum temperature for growth is around 20 °C (68 °F). Leeks are more cold-tolerant than other cultivated Allium species and can be produced year-round in Europe. They tolerate standing in the field for an extended harvest, which takes place up to six months from planting.

Production of leeks

Leek yield

=== Pests and diseases ===
Leeks suffer from insect pests, including the thrips species Thrips tabaci and the leek moth. Leeks are also susceptible to leek rust (Puccinia allii). Damage from thrips is greatest when under water stress in hot, dry weather. In these conditions, insect reproduction occurs quickly while plant growth is slowed. Thrips can be controlled by chemical pesticides and by intercropping with legumes or other plants.

== Varieties ==
Leek cultivars may be treated as a single cultivar group, e.g., as A. ampeloprasum 'Leek Group'. The cultivars can be subdivided in several ways, but the most common types are "summer leeks", intended for harvest in the season when planted, and overwintering leeks, meant to be harvested in the spring of the year following planting. Summer leek types are generally smaller than overwintering types; overwintering types are generally more strongly flavored. Cultivars include 'King Richard' and 'Tadorna Blue'.

== Culinary use ==
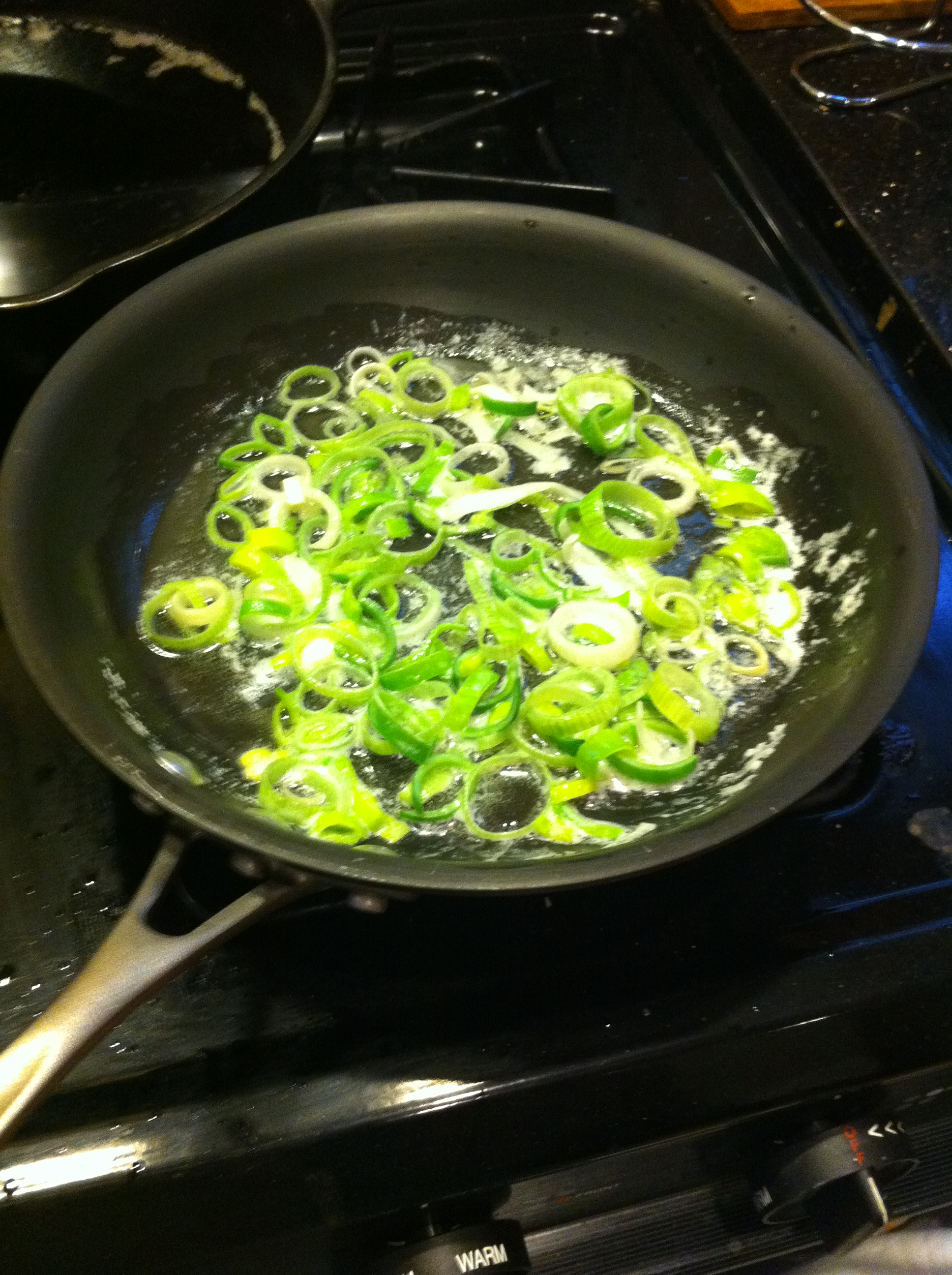
Fresh leeks sautéing

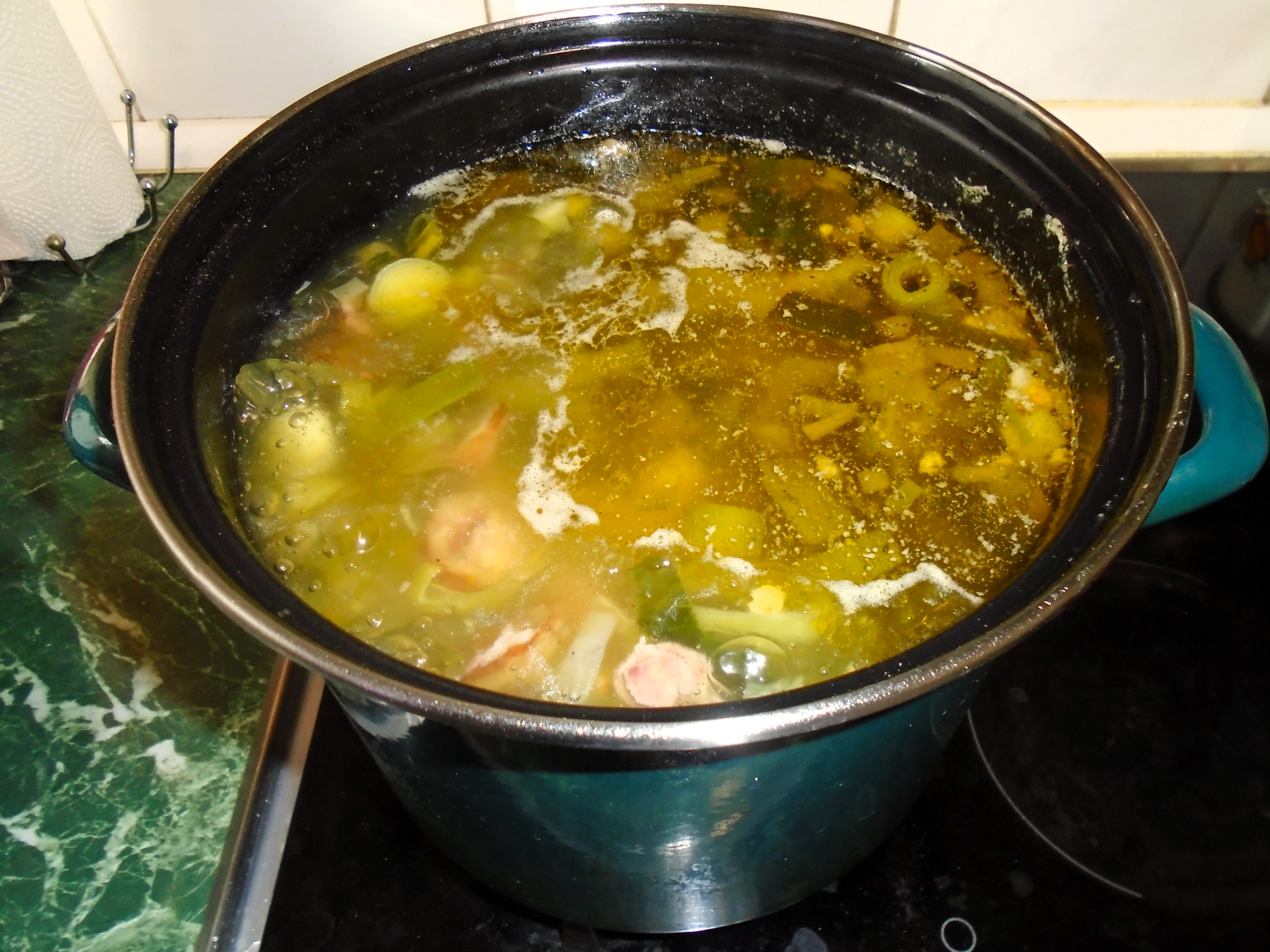
Leek soup

Raw leeks, bulb & lower leaves
Nutritional value per 100 g (3.5 oz)
- Energy: 255 kJ (61 kcal)
- Carbohydrates: 14.15 g
- Sugars: 3.9 g
- Dietary fiber: 1.8 g
- Fat: 0.3 g
- Protein: 1.5 g
Vitamins and minerals
Vitamins	Quantity %DV^{†}
Vitamin A equiv. beta-Carotene lutein zeaxanthin	9% 83 μg 9% 1000 μg 1900 μg
Thiamine (B1)	5% 0.06 mg
Riboflavin (B2)	2% 0.03 mg
Niacin (B3)	3% 0.4 mg
Pantothenic acid (B5)	3% 0.14 mg
Vitamin B6	14% 0.233 mg
Folate (B9)	16% 64 μg
Vitamin C	13% 12 mg
Vitamin E	6% 0.92 mg
Vitamin K	39% 47 μg
Minerals	Quantity %DV^{†}
Calcium	5% 59 mg
Iron	12% 2.1 mg
Magnesium	7% 28 mg
Manganese	21% 0.481 mg
Phosphorus	3% 35 mg
Potassium	6% 180 mg
- Other constituents: Quantity
- Water: 83 g
- Link to USDA Database entry
- ^{†}Percentages estimated using US recommendations for adults, except for potassium, which is estimated based on expert recommendation from the National Academies.

Leeks have a mild, onion-like taste. In its raw state, the vegetable is crunchy and firm. The edible portions of the leek are the white base of the leaves (above the roots and stem base), the light green parts, and to a lesser extent, the dark green parts of the leaves. The dark green portion is usually discarded because it has a tough texture, but it can be sautéed or more commonly added to stock for flavor. A few leaves are sometimes tied with twine and other herbs to form a bouquet garni.

Leeks are typically chopped into slices 5–10 mm thick. The slices tend to fall apart due to the layered structure of the leek. The different ways of preparing the vegetable are:

- Boiling turns it soft and mild in taste. Whole boiled leeks, served cold with vinaigrette, are popular in France, where leeks are nicknamed asperges du pauvre 'poor man's asparagus'.
- Frying leaves it crunchier and preserves the taste.
- Raw leeks can be used in salads, doing especially well when they are the prime ingredient.
- In Turkish cuisine, leeks are chopped into thick slices, then boiled and separated into leaves, and finally filled with a filling usually containing rice, herbs (generally parsley and dill), onion, and black pepper. For sarma with olive oil, currants, pine nuts, and cinnamon are added, and for sarma with meat, minced meat is added to the filling. In Turkey, especially zeytinyağlı pırasa (leek with olive oil), ekşili pırasa (sour leek), etli pırasa (leek with meat), pırasa musakka (leek musakka), pırasalı börek (börek with leek), and pırasa köftesi (leek meatballs) are also cooked.
- Papet Vaudois consists of boiled leeks and potatoes. It is the emblematic dish of the Canton of Vaud.
- Keftikas de Prasa, or leek patties, are a staple of Sephardic Jewish cuisine and are served on holidays such as Rosh HaShana and Passover.

Leeks are an ingredient of cock-a-leekie soup, leek and potato soup, and vichyssoise, as well as plain leek soup. Because of their symbolism in Wales (see below), they have come to be used extensively in that country's cuisine. Elsewhere in Britain, leeks have come back in favor only in the last 50 years, having been overlooked for several centuries.

== Nutrition ==
Raw leek (bulb and lower leaves) is 83% water, 14% carbohydrates, 1% protein, and contains negligible fat (table). A 100-gram (3 1/2 oz) reference amount supplies 255 kilojoules (61 kcal) of food energy and is a rich source (20% or more of the Daily Value, DV) of vitamin K and manganese (table). It is a moderate source (10–19% DV) of vitamin B6, folate, vitamin C, and iron (reference in table).

== Historical consumption ==
The Hebrew Bible talks of חציר, identified by commentators as leek, and says it is abundant in Egypt. Dried specimens from archaeological sites in ancient Egypt, as well as wall carvings and drawings, indicate that the leek was a part of the Egyptian diet from at least the second millennium BCE. Texts also show that it was grown in Mesopotamia from the beginning of the second-millennium BCE.

Leeks (porrum) were eaten in ancient Rome and regarded as superior to garlic and onions. The 1st century CE cookbook Apicius contains four recipes involving leeks. Raw leek was the favorite vegetable of the Emperor Nero, who consumed it in soup or oil, believing it beneficial to the quality of his voice. This earned him the nickname "Porrophagus" or "Leek Eater".

== Cultural significance ==
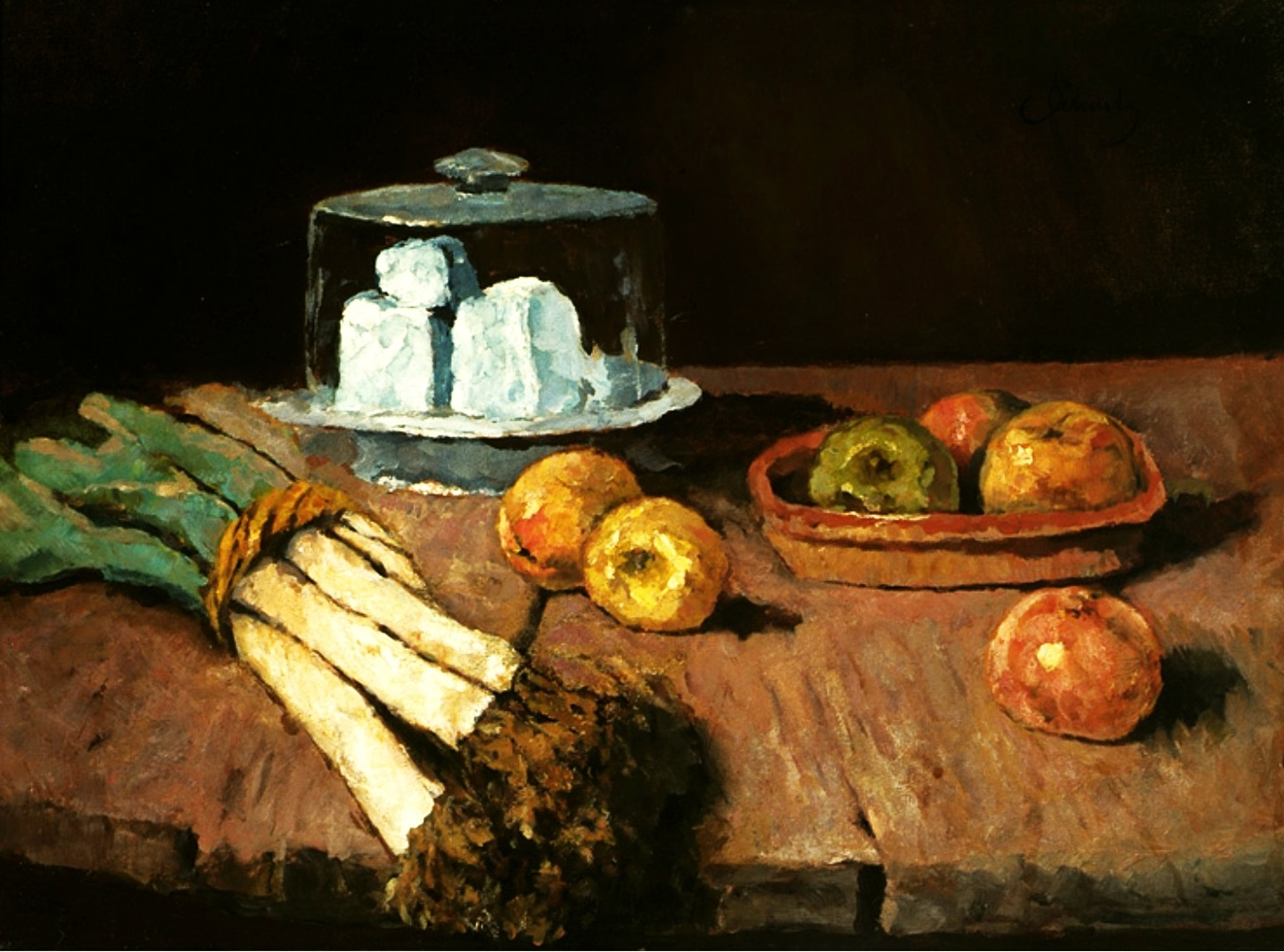
Still life with leeks by Carl Schuch (National Museum, Warsaw)

The leek is one of the national emblems of Wales, and it or the daffodil (in Welsh, the daffodil is known as "Peter's leek", Cenhinen Bedr) is worn on St. David's Day. According to one Welsh myth, King Cadwaladr of Gwynedd ordered his soldiers to identify themselves by wearing the vegetable on their helmets in an ancient battle against the Saxons that took place in a leek field. The Elizabethan poet Michael Drayton stated, in contrast, that the tradition was a tribute to Saint David, who ate only leeks when he was fasting.

The leek (Welsh: cenhinen) has been known to be a symbol of Wales for a long time; Shakespeare, for example, refers to the custom of wearing a leek as an "ancient tradition" in Henry V (c. 1599). In the play, Henry V tells the Welsh officer Fluellen that he, too, is wearing a leek "for I am Welsh, you know, good countryman." The 1985 and 1990 British one pound coins bear the design of a leek in a coronet, representing Wales. One version of the 2013 British one pound coin shows a leek with a daffodil.

Alongside the other national floral emblems of countries currently and formerly in the Commonwealth or part of the United Kingdom (including the English Tudor Rose, Scottish thistle, Irish shamrock, Canadian maple leaf, Australian wattle, New Zealand silver fern, and Indian lotus), the Welsh leek appeared on the coronation gown of Elizabeth II. Norman Hartnell designed it; when Hartnell asked if he could exchange the leek for the more aesthetically pleasing Welsh daffodil, he was told no.

Perhaps the most visible use of the leek, however, is as the cap badge of the Welsh Guards, a battalion within the Household Division of the British Army.

In Romania, the leek is also widely considered a symbol of Oltenia, a historical region in the country's southwestern part.

In North Portugal, specially in Porto, the blooming Leek is used in Festa de São João (Saint John celebration), offering it to smell or gentle hit other peoples head to give good luck and protection. This ritual have pagan origins and was integrated in catholic festivities.

== Gallery ==
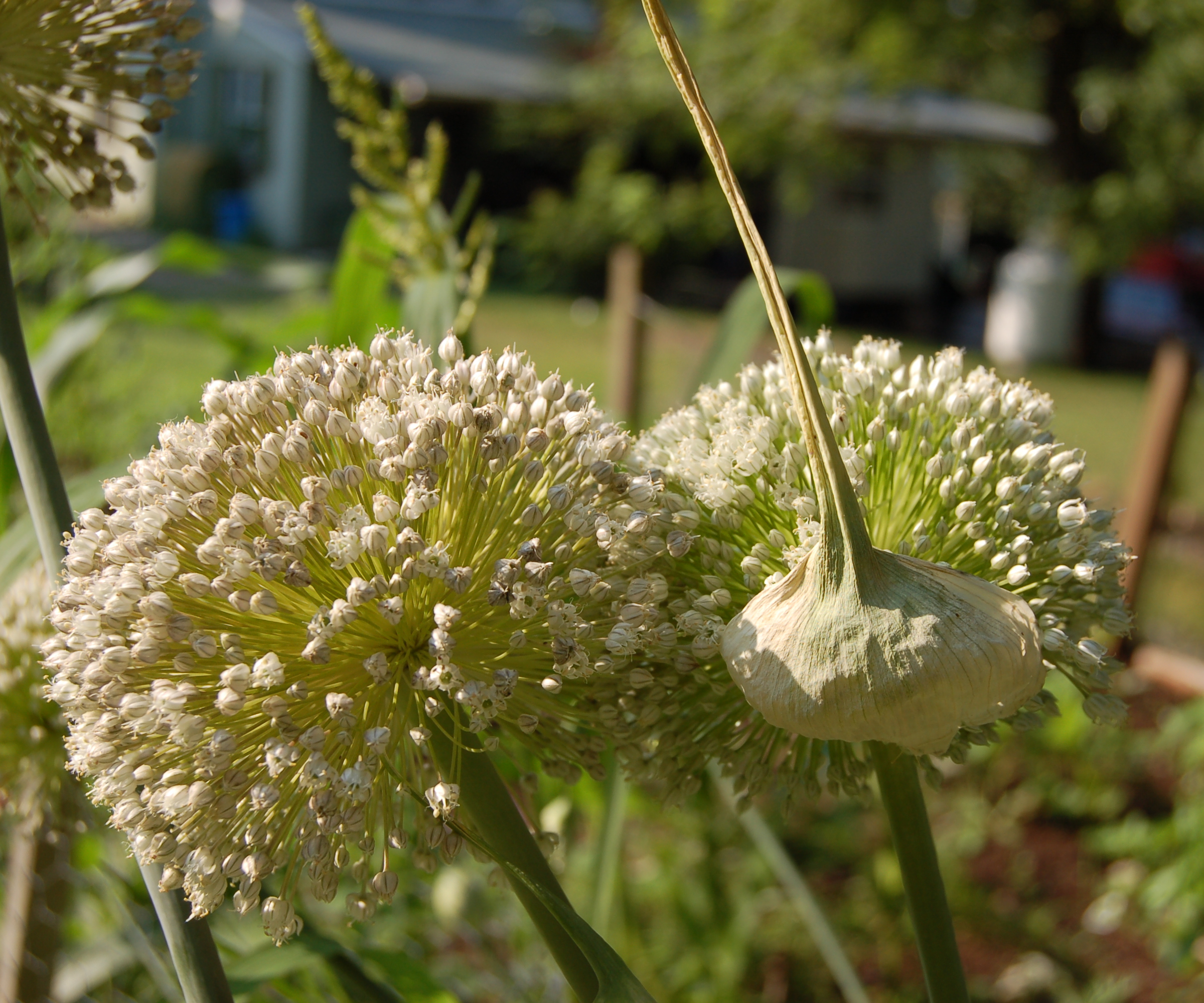
Two blooming flower heads

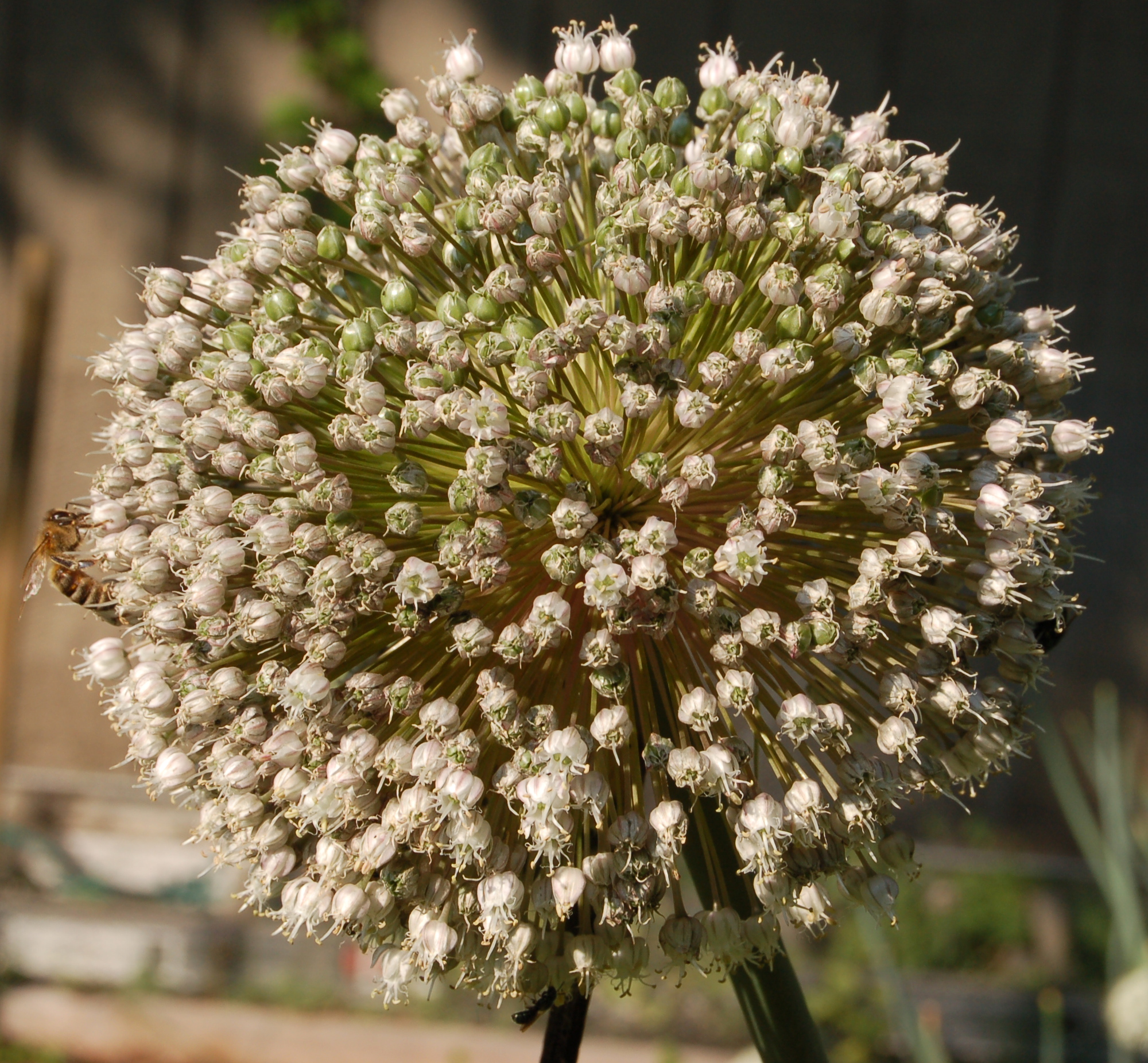
A largely spent flower head showing open flowers, as well as developing seed pods

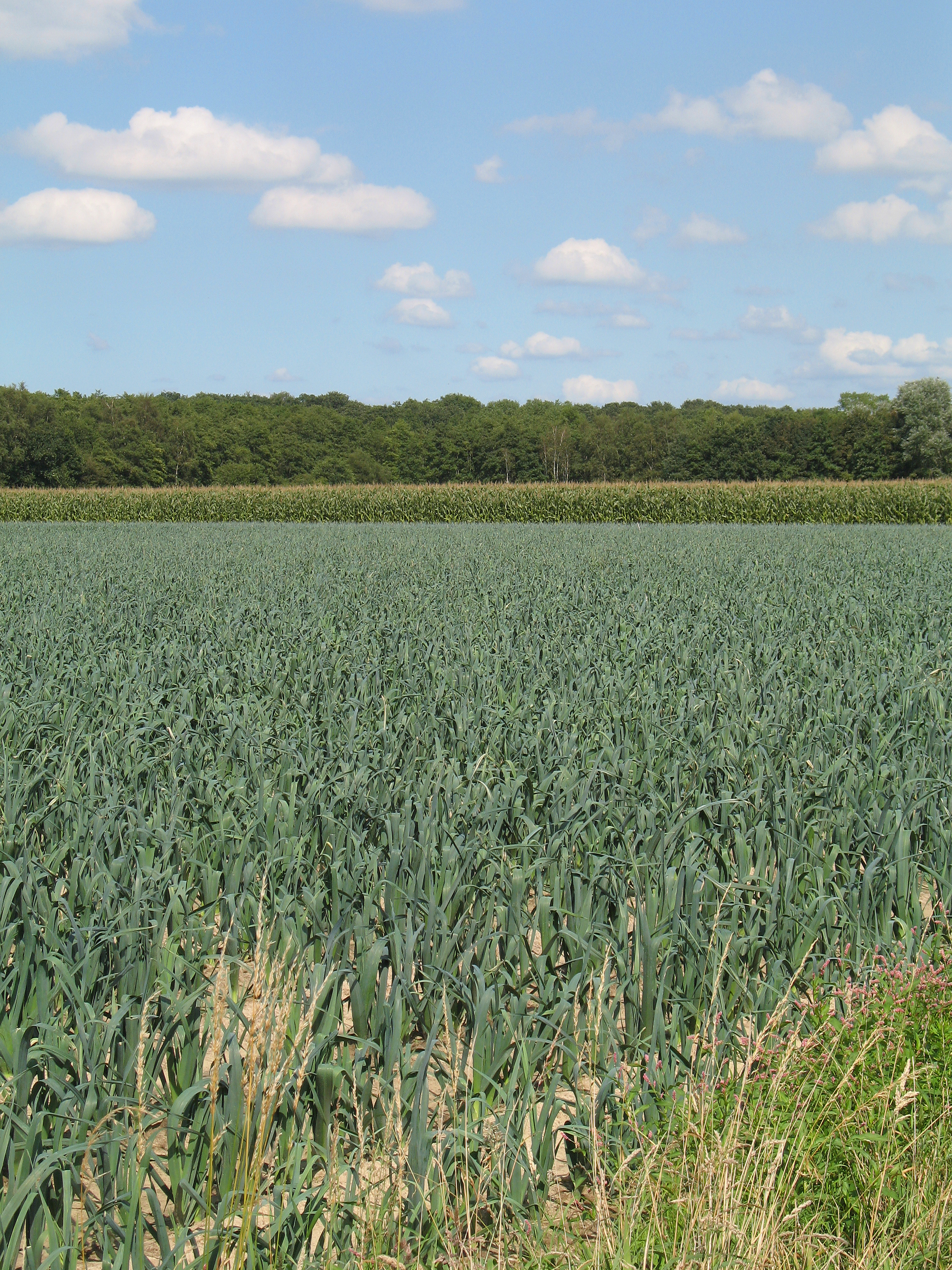
Leek field in Houthulst, Belgium

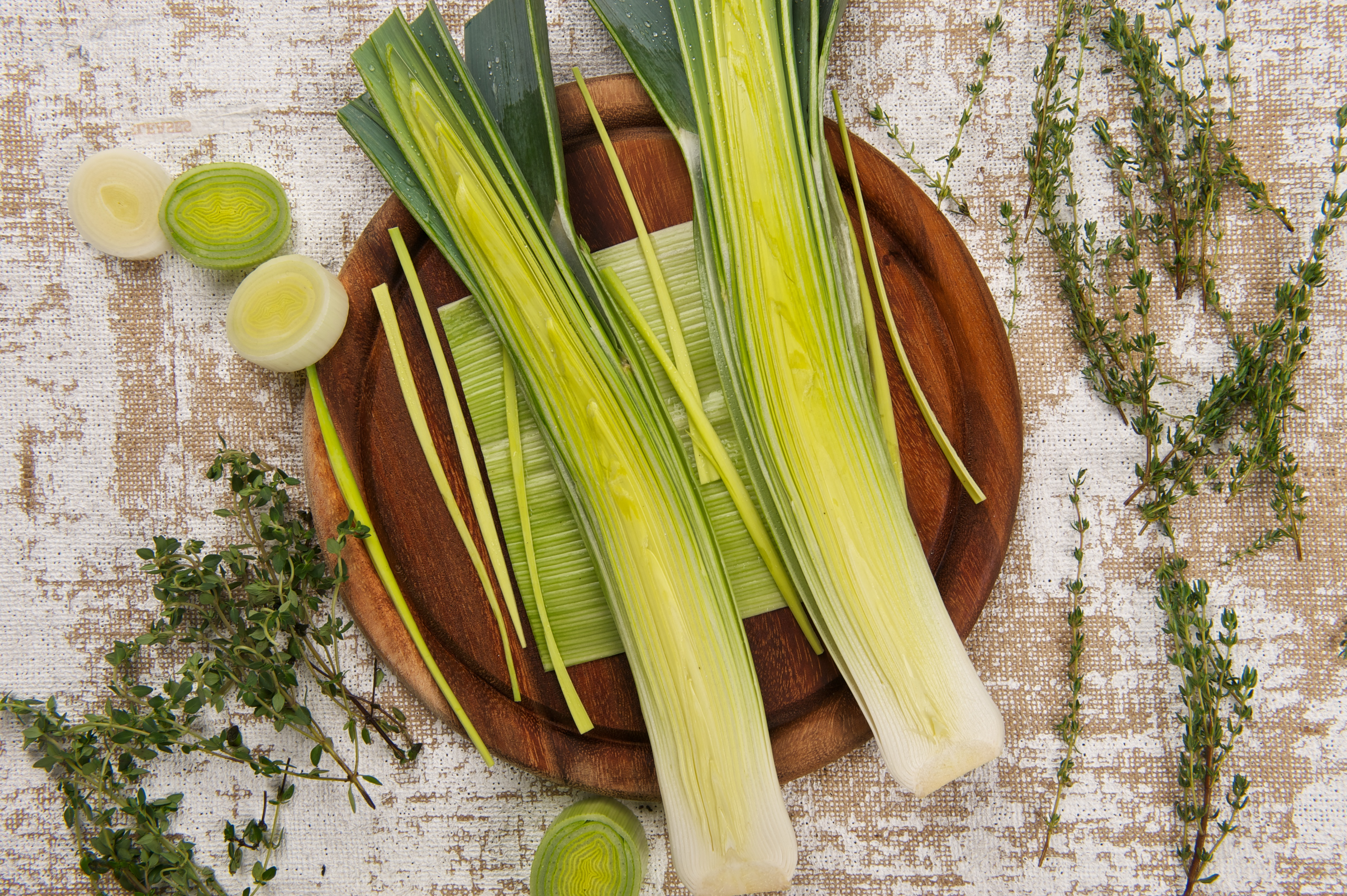
Still life of leeks and thyme

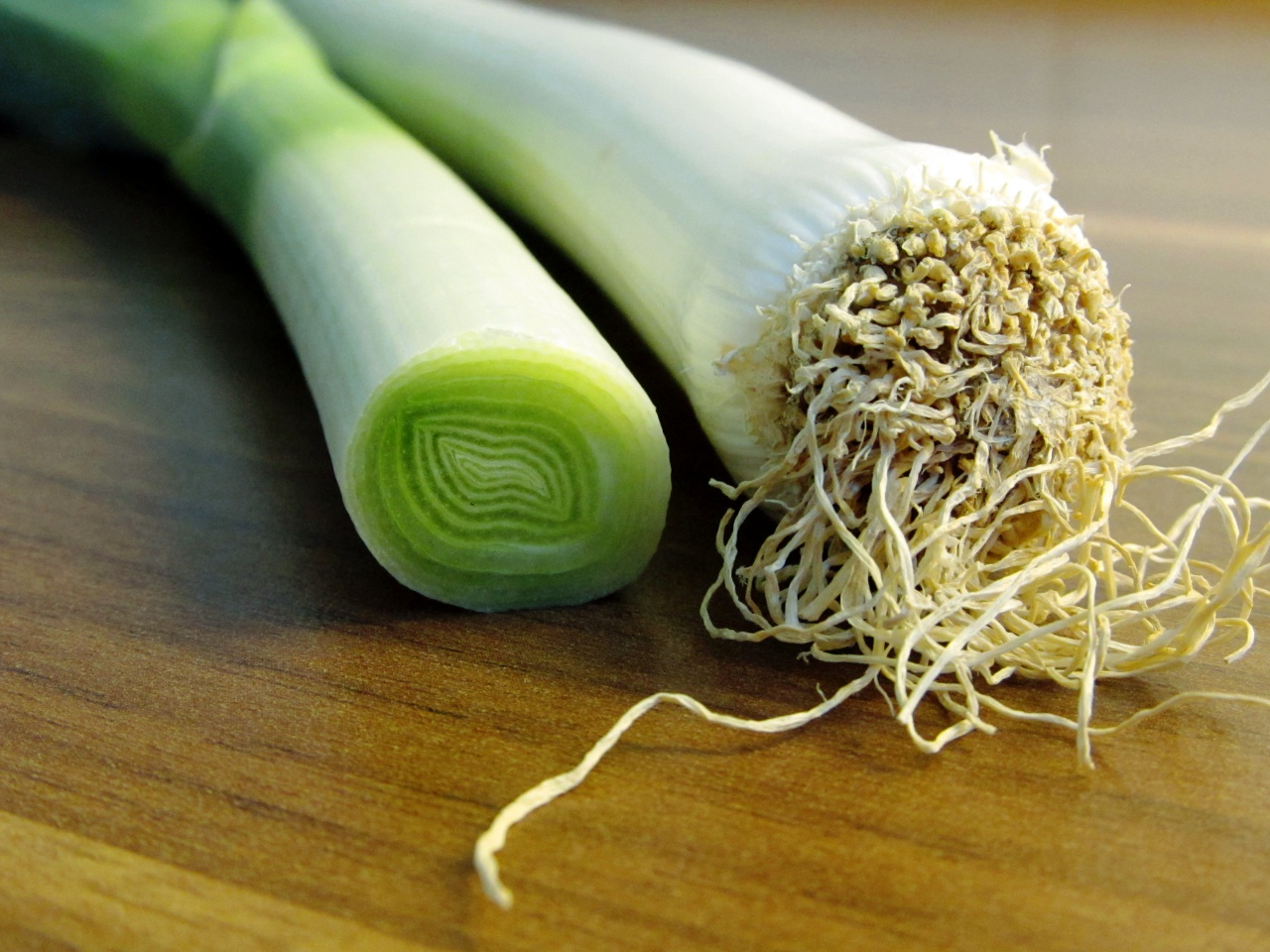
Section and root base

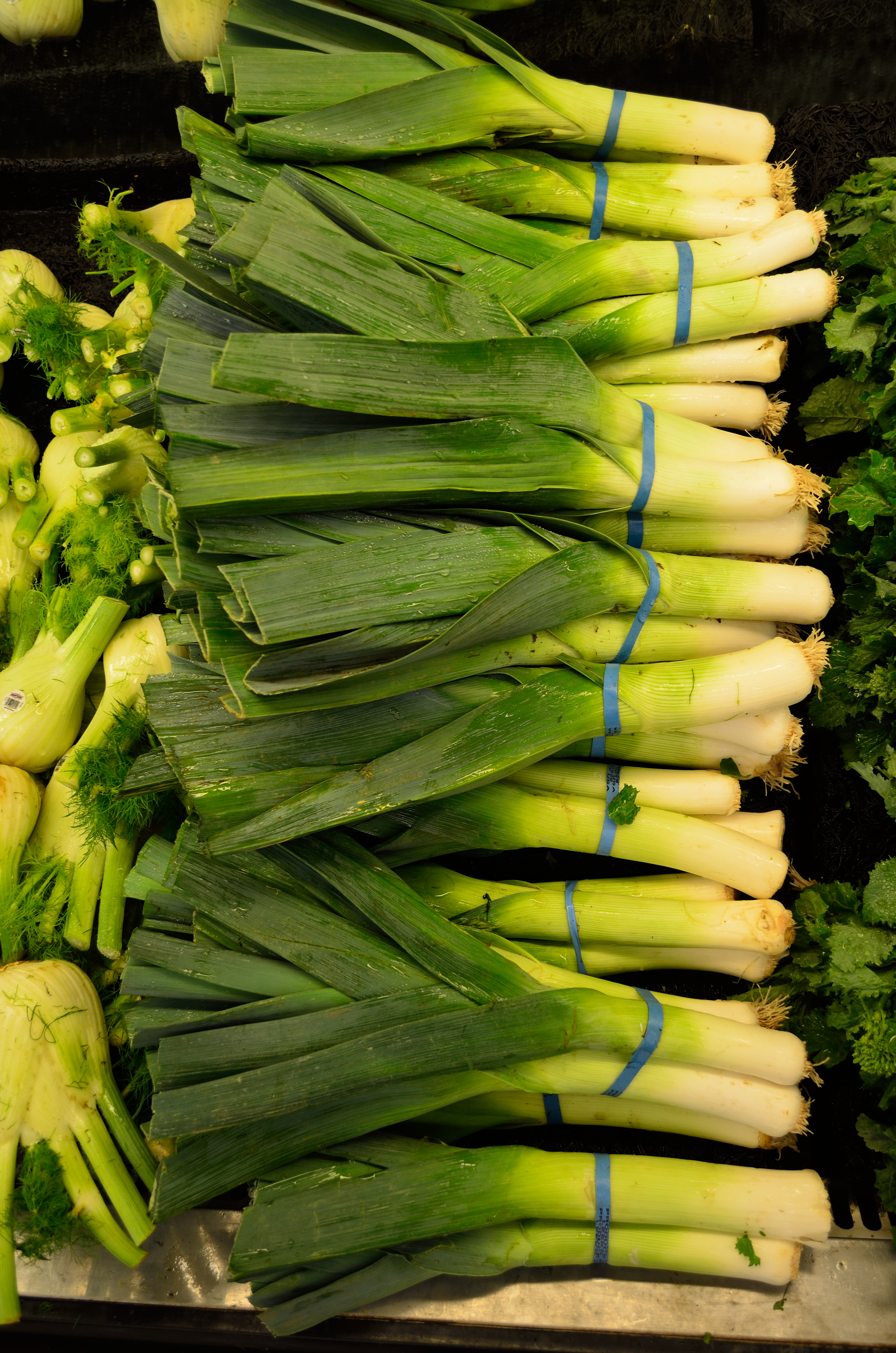
Leek sold in a supermarket

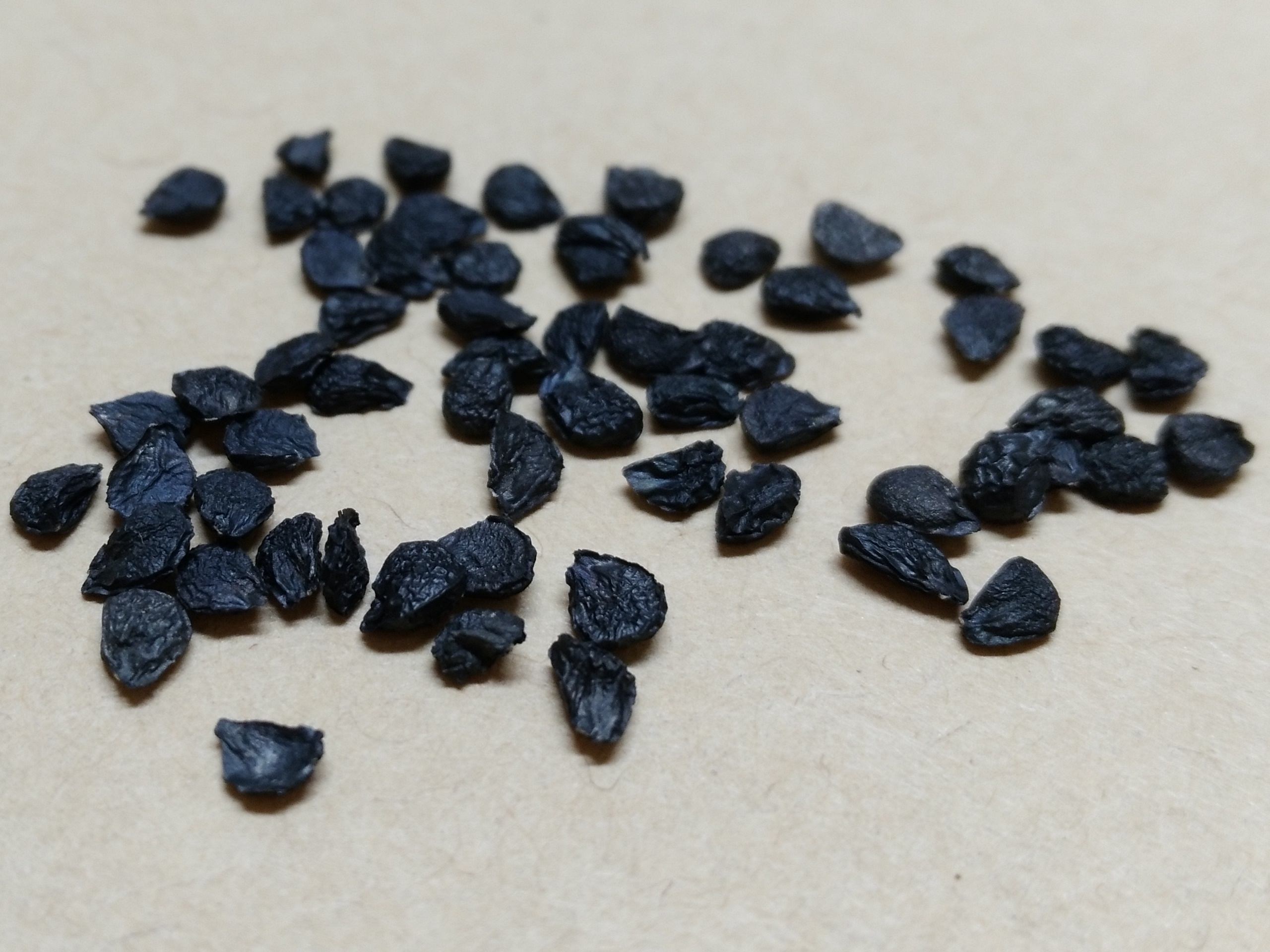
Leek seeds

== See also ==
- Allium tricoccum, a North American plant commonly known as "wild leek"
- Culture of Wales
- Farfetch'd and Sirfetch'd, Pokémon that carry spring leeks as weapons
- Hatsune Miku, whose character item, Green Onion, is often confused with a leek
- Kurrat, Egyptian leek
- Laukaz, a rune that has been speculated to mean "leek"
- List of vegetables
- Loituma Girl, also known as "Leekspin"
- Scallion
- Welsh onion
