= Sausage gravy =

Breakfast dish from the Southern United States

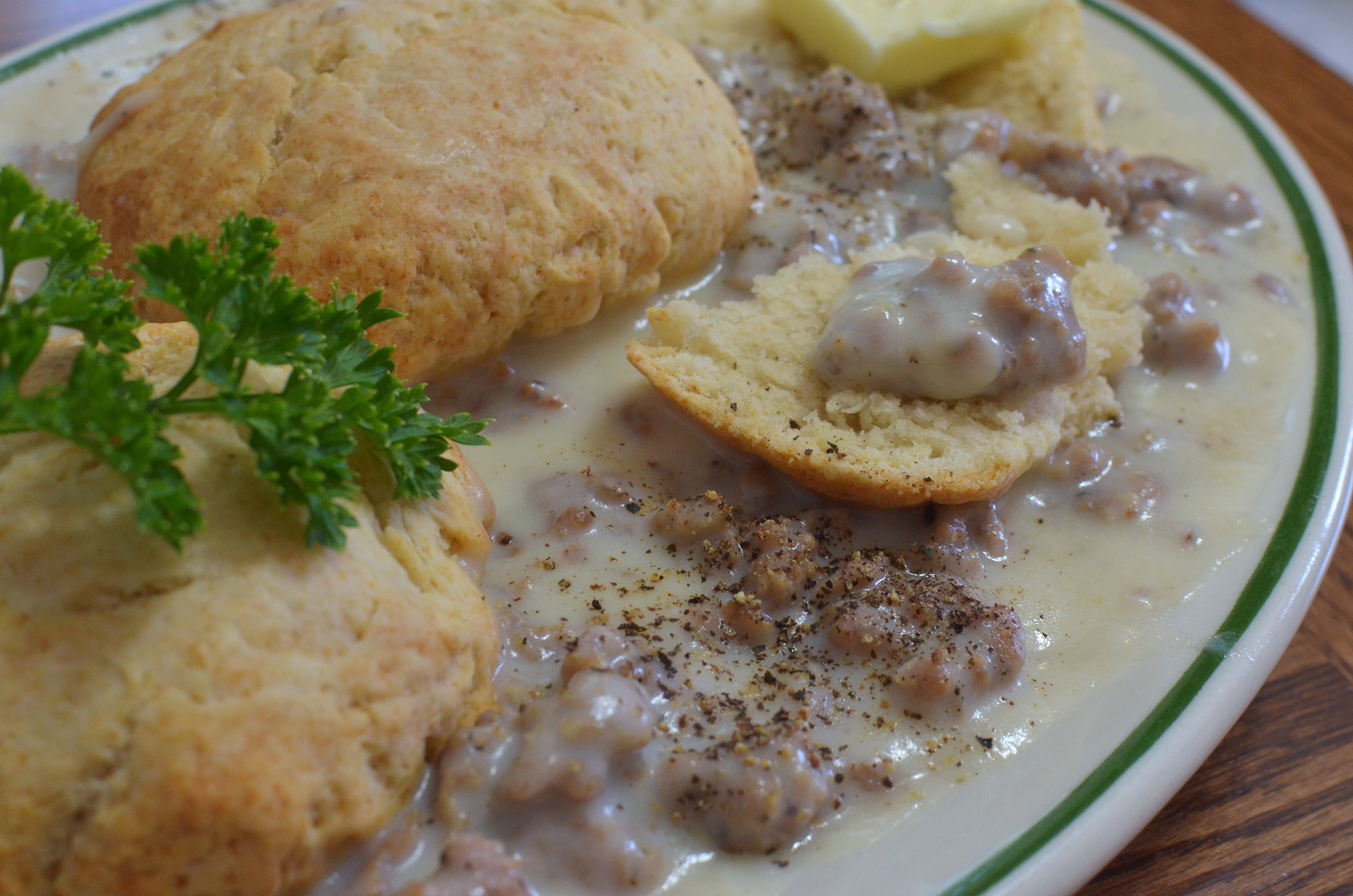
Biscuits and sausage gravy

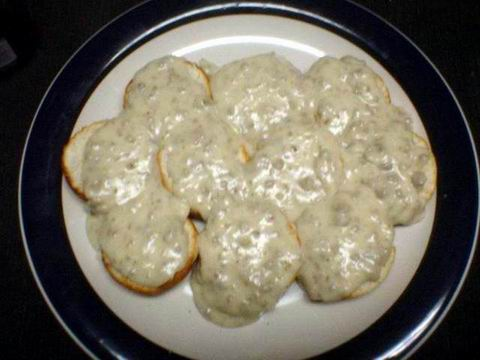
Sausage gravy served atop a biscuits and gravy dish

Sausage gravy is a traditional Southern breakfast dish in the United States. After loose pork sausage is cooked in a pan and removed, a roux is formed by browning flour in the residual fat. Milk and seasonings, such as salt and pepper, are added to create a moderately thick gravy, to which the cooked sausage is added. Occasionally, ingredients such as cayenne pepper or a spicy sausage are used to make a spicier gravy.

Sausage gravy is traditionally served as part of the dish biscuits and gravy and accompanied by other typical Southern breakfast items, such as fried eggs, sliced tomatoes and bacon.

== See also ==
- List of sausage dishes
