= Biscuits and gravy =

Breakfast dish in the United States

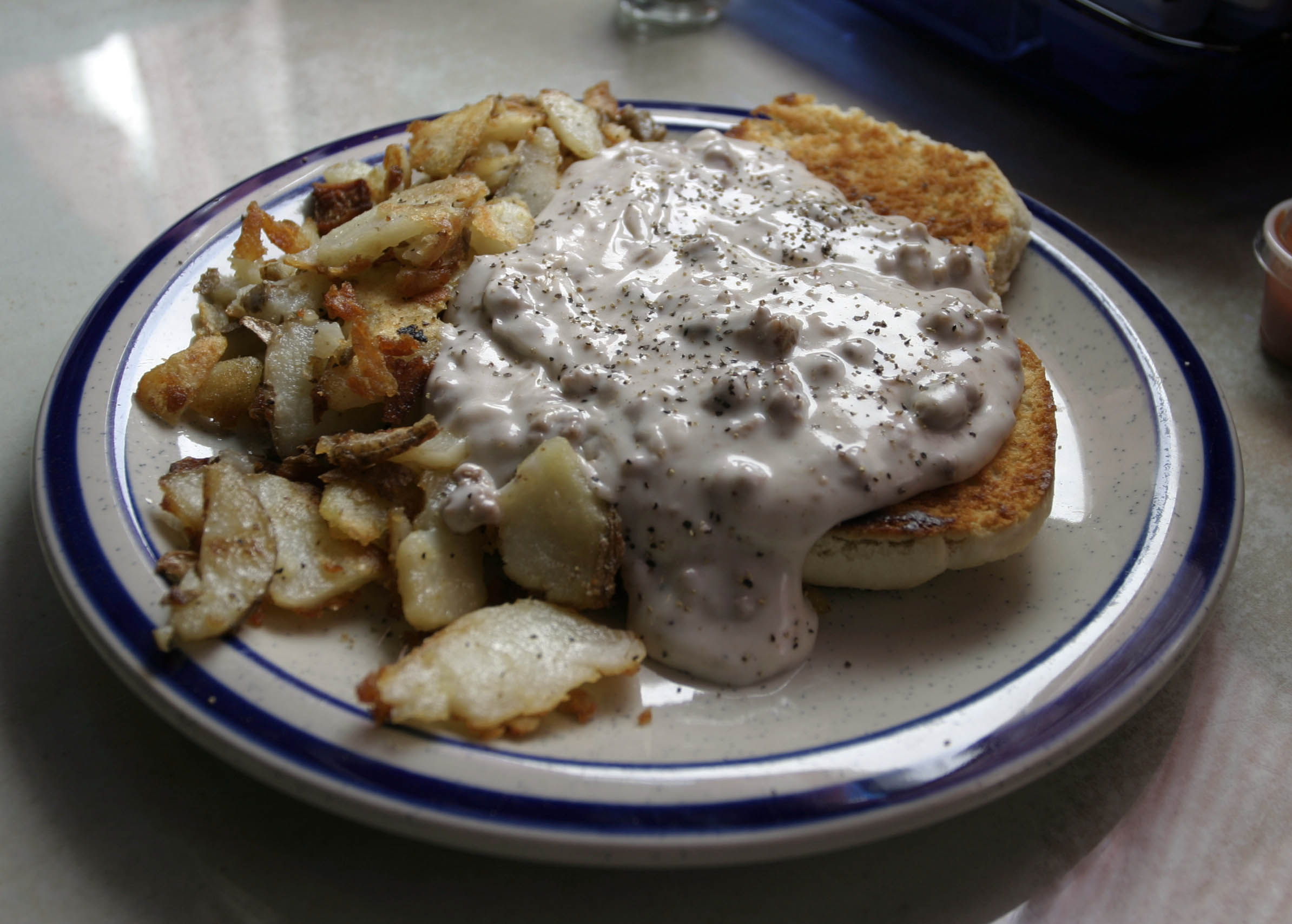
A serving of biscuits and gravy, accompanied by home fries

Biscuits and gravy is a popular breakfast dish in the United States, especially in the South. The dish consists of soft dough biscuits covered in white sausage gravy, made from the drippings of cooked pork sausage, flour, milk, and often (but not always) bits of sausage, bacon, ground beef, or other meat. The gravy is often flavored with black pepper; see Sausage gravy.

== History ==
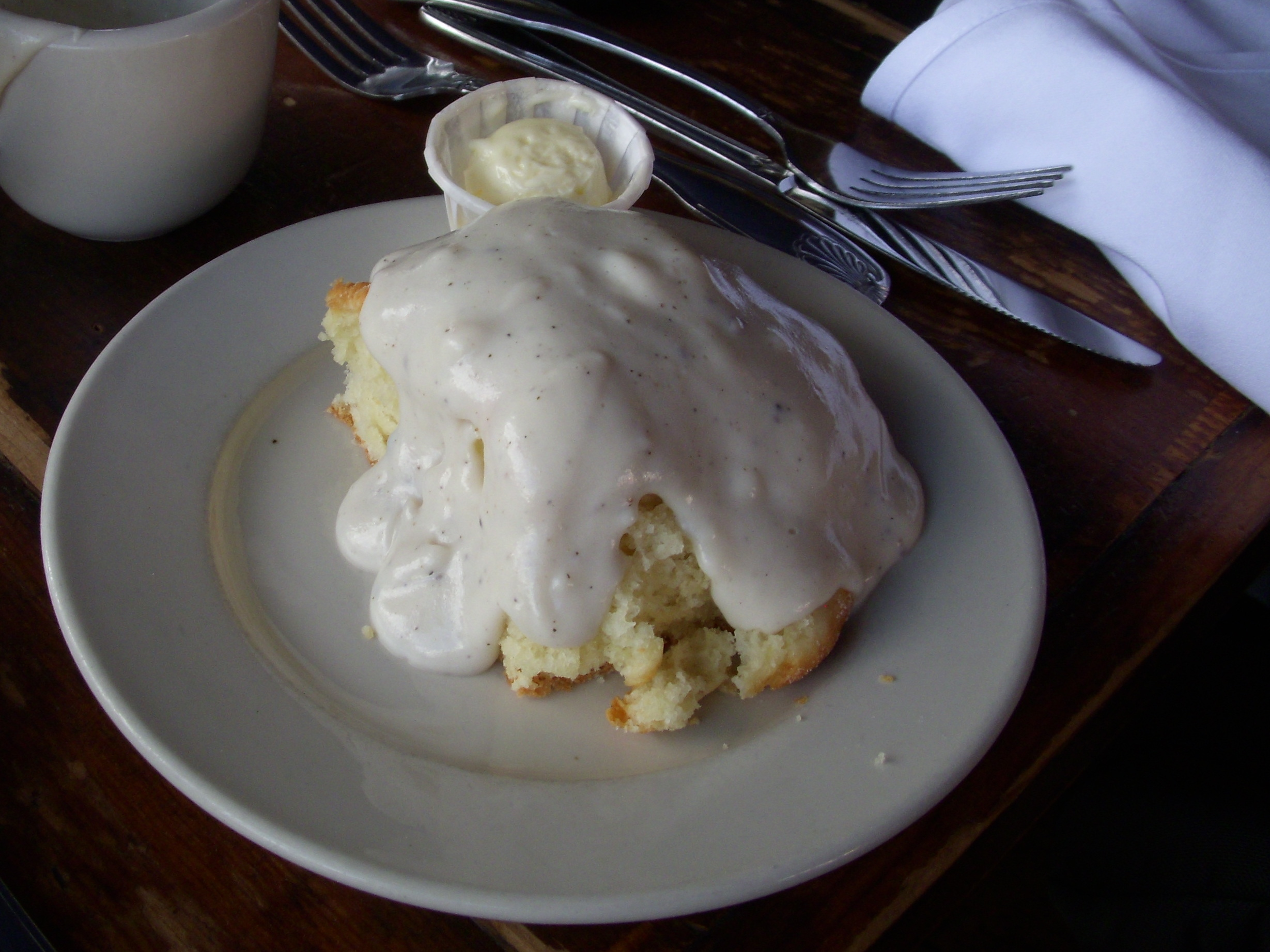
Biscuits and gravy from a restaurant

The meal emerged as a distinct regional dish after the American Revolutionary War (1775–1783), when stocks of foodstuffs were in short supply. Breakfast was necessarily the most substantial meal of the day for a person facing a day of work on the plantations in the American South. In addition, the lack of supplies and money meant it had to be cheap.

== Variations ==
Tomato gravy is white gravy mixed with crushed or diced tomatoes.

A variation of the dish served in the US military is sometimes referred to as "SOS", which means "shit on a shingle", and is prepared with either biscuits or toast. It has been a staple military comfort food for over 100 years.

== See also ==
- Chipped beef on toast
- Creamed eggs on toast
- Greasy spoon
- List of bread dishes
- List of regional dishes of the United States
