= Three Rivers Festival =

Annual festival in Fort Wayne, Indiana, U.S.

- Genre: Pop
- Begins: First Saturday after Independence Day
- Ends: First Sunday after Independence Day
- Frequency: Annual
- Locations: Fort Wayne, Indiana
- Years active: 1969–2023
- Inaugurated: 1969
- Previous event: 2023
- Organiser: Three Rivers Festival, Inc.
- Website: threeriversfestival.org

The Three Rivers Festival was an annual multi-day event held in Fort Wayne, Indiana. The festival lasted for nine days in mid-July, starting on the first Friday after Independence Day. Events included concerts, a community parade, amusement rides, a bed race, art and craft shows, children's and seniors mini-fests, an International Village, and a fireworks finale.

It was a celebration of the heritage of Fort Wayne, established during the French and Indian War at the confluence of three rivers: the Maumee, St. Marys, and St. Joseph.

== History ==
At the first Three Rivers Festival in 1969, an estimated 100,000 people attended a grand parade and 60 events on the Columbia Street Landing.

The 1973 edition attracted one million visitors. Among the highlights was an air show by the Navy's Blue Angels. In 1976, the festival included an international beer can collectors convention. That year, attendance topped 2 million. In 1977, the festival added fireworks for the first time. That edition's opening day parade was the second largest in the state. The opening of the 1979 festival was marked by 700 balloons released from the top of a city building.

By 1980, the festival had grown to 206 events across Fort Wayne. The following year, the festival introduced a children's parade and attempted to set a record for the World's Longest Hot Dog, at 527 feet (160.6 m) long. In 1980 the festival featured the World's Biggest Pretzel at 10 feet (3.0 m) in diameter.

In 1991, a $20,000 Arts United grant expanded Sunday in the Park to art events at Seniors Day and the Children's Festival. By 1999, the Art in the Park was expanded to include Main Street, featuring a juried show of 85 national artists. That same year, the Three Rivers Festival had a crowd of 500,000, maintaining its position as the second-largest event in Indiana.

In 2021, the festival held its inaugural drag show. The two-hour event featured Fort Wayne local, Della Licious.

In February 2025, it was announced that the 2025 festival would be cancelled as the owners filed for Chapter 11 bankruptcy protection after the festival's boarding ultimately decided to begin bankruptcy proceedings.

== Events ==
The Three Rivers Festival events were centered in Headwaters Park in downtown Fort Wayne, Indiana.

=== Art In The Park ===
Art in the Park takes place on the first weekend of the festival. It includes a juried fine arts show and sale, located on Freimann Square, Main Street and Barr Street. Over 100 artists from across the country sell oils, watercolors, photography, sculpture, pottery, and more.

=== Opening Day Parade ===
The two-hour parade starts in the West Central neighborhood and wound through downtown Fort Wayne. A local musical group typically opens the parade with the national anthem, followed by many parade units, area high school marching bands, local celebrities, and approximately 100 other entries.

=== Fireworks Finale ===
The finale of the festival was a fireworks show, noted as one of Northeast Indiana's largest pyrotechnic show.

== Financial Background & Sponsors ==
Three Rivers Festival was a 501(c)4 not-for-profit organization founded in 1969, and funded entirely by vendor participation fees, souvenir sales, refreshment sales, entertainment ticket sales, and the sponsorship and support of area businesses.

The Festival Title sponsor for the 2009 and 2010 editions was Fort Wayne Newspapers. PNC, Sweetwater and STAR 88.3 were other major sponsors in 2010, with National Serv-all sponsoring the edition's Fireworks Finale.
