= Hot dog =

Sausage in a bun

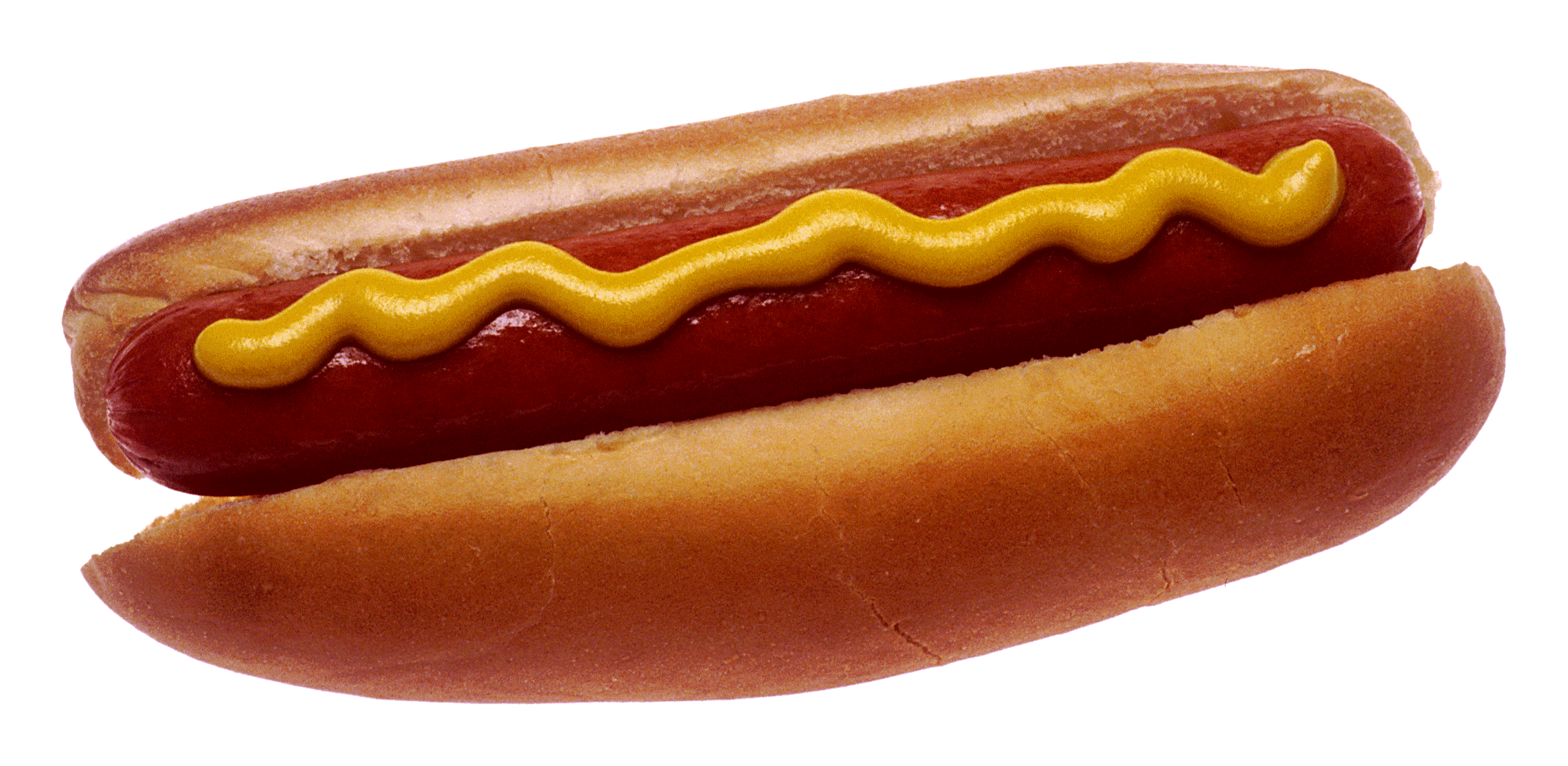
- A typical hot dog with American mustard as a condiment
- Alternative names: Frankfurter, frank, wiener, weenie, tube steak, sausage, banger, coney
- Type: Fast food, finger food
- Place of origin: Germany (early version); United States (modern version)
- Serving temperature: Hot
- Main ingredients: Sausage made from pork, beef, chicken, turkey or combinations thereof and a bun
- Ingredients generally used: Ketchup; Mustard; Chili; Chopped vegetables; sauerkraut
- Variations: Multiple

A hot dog is a grilled, steamed, or boiled sausage served in the slit of a partially sliced bun. The term hot dog can also refer to the sausage itself. The sausage used is a wiener (Vienna sausage) or a frankfurter (Frankfurter Würstchen, also just called frank). The names of these sausages commonly refer to their assembled dish. Hot dog preparation and condiments vary worldwide. Common condiments include mustard, ketchup, relish, onions in tomato sauce, and cheese sauce. Other toppings include sauerkraut, jalapeños, chili, grated cheese, coleslaw, bacon and olives. Hot dog variants include the corn dog and pigs in a blanket.

These types of sausages were culturally imported from Germany and became popular in the United States. It became a working-class street food in the U.S., sold at stands and carts. The hot dog has become closely associated with baseball and American culture. Although particularly connected with New York City and its cuisine, the hot dog eventually became ubiquitous throughout the US during the 20th century. Its preparation varies regionally in the country, emerging as an important part of other regional cuisines, including Chicago street cuisine.

== History ==
A hot dog as served on Coney Island in 1940

The word frankfurter comes from Frankfurt, Germany, where pork sausages similar to hot dogs originated. These sausages, Frankfurter Würstchen, were known since the 13th century and given to the people on the event of imperial coronations, starting with the coronation of Maximilian II, Holy Roman Emperor, as King. "Wiener" refers to Vienna, Austria (German: Wien), home to a sausage made of a mixture of pork and beef. Johann Georg Lahner, an 18th/19th century butcher from the Franconian city of Coburg, is said to have brought the Frankfurter Würstchen to Vienna, where he added beef to the mixture and simply called it Frankfurter. Nowadays, in German-speaking countries, except Austria, hot dog sausages are called Wiener or Wiener Würstchen (Würstchen means "little sausage"), to differentiate them from the original pork-only mixture from Frankfurt. In Swiss German, it is called Wienerli, while in Austria the terms Frankfurter or Frankfurter Würstel are used.

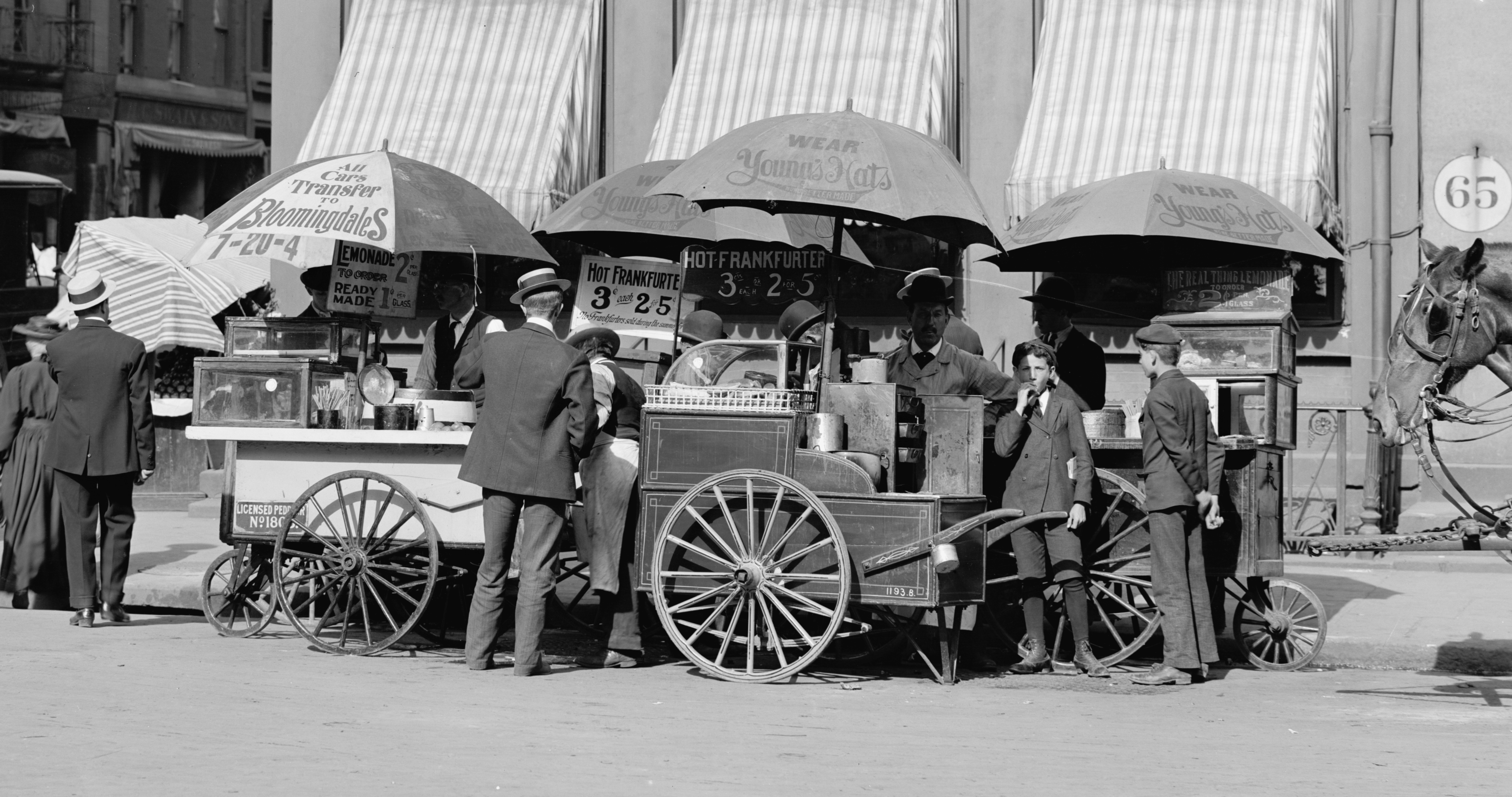
Carts selling frankfurters in New York City, c. 1906. The price is listed as "3 cents each or 2 for 5 cents".

It is not definitively known who started the practice of serving the sausage in the bun. One of the strongest claims comes from Harry M. Stevens who was a food concessionaire. The claim is that, while working at the New York Polo Grounds in 1901, he came upon the idea of using small French rolls to hold the sausages when the waxed paper they were using ran out.

A German immigrant named Feuchtwanger, from Frankfurt, in Hesse, allegedly pioneered the practice in the American Midwest; there are several versions of the story with varying details. According to one account, Feuchtwanger's wife proposed the use of a bun in 1880: Feuchtwanger sold hot dogs on the streets of St. Louis, Missouri, and provided gloves to his customers so that they could handle the sausages without burning their hands. Losing money when customers did not return the gloves, Feuchtwanger's wife suggested serving the sausages in a roll instead. In another version, Antoine Feuchtwanger, or Anton Ludwig Feuchtwanger, served sausages in rolls at the World's Fair—either at the 1904 Louisiana Purchase Exposition in St. Louis, or, earlier, at the 1893 World's Columbian Exposition, in Chicago—again, allegedly because the white gloves provided to customers to protect their hands were being kept as souvenirs.

Another possible origin for serving the sausages in rolls is the pieman Charles Feltman, at Coney Island in New York City. In 1867 he had a cart made with a stove on which to boil sausages, and a compartment to keep buns in which they were served fresh. In 1871 he leased land to build a permanent restaurant, and the business grew, selling far more than just the "Coney Island Red Hots" as they were known.

== Etymology ==
Dog Factory, a short film by Edwin S. Porter poking fun at what went into hot dogs in 1904

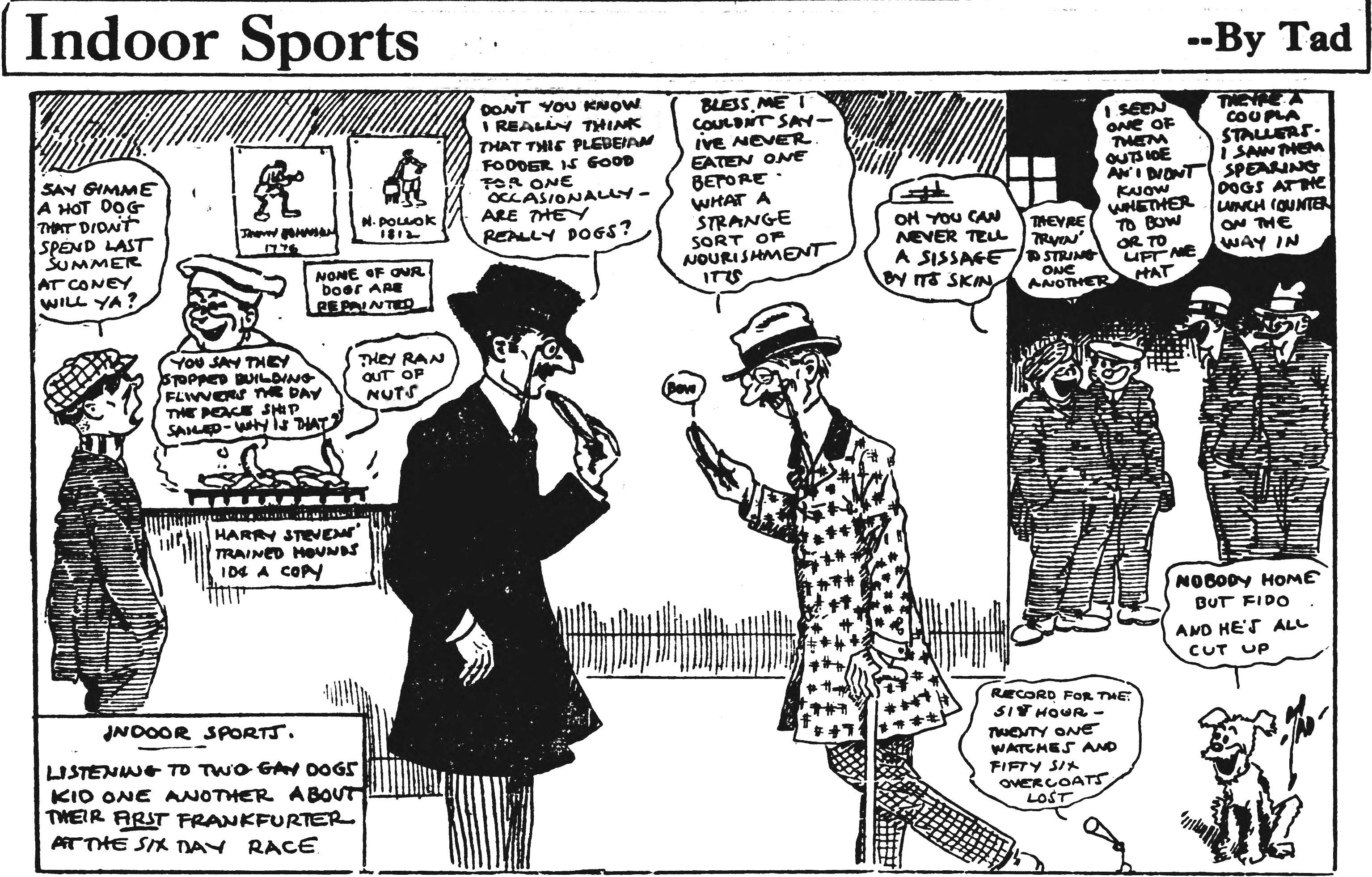
Tad Dorgan's Indoor Sports strip from January 8, 1916, using the term hot dog

The term dog has been used as a synonym for sausage since the 1800s, possibly from accusations that sausage makers used dog meat in their sausages.

In Germany the consumption of dog meat was common in Saxony, Silesia, Anhalt, and Bavaria during the 19th and 20th centuries. Hot dogs occasionally contained it.

An early use of the term hot dog in reference to the sausage-meat appears in 1884:

even the innocent "wienerworst" man will be barred from dispensing hot dog on the street corner.

It was used to mean a sausage in casing in 1892:

the "hot dog" was quickly inserted in a gash in a roll

and in other newspapers in 1893.

This makes the legend that hot dog was coined by the newspaper cartoonist Thomas Aloysius "Tad" Dorgan around 1900 impossible; Dorgan's earliest documented use of hot dog was in 1906.

== General description ==
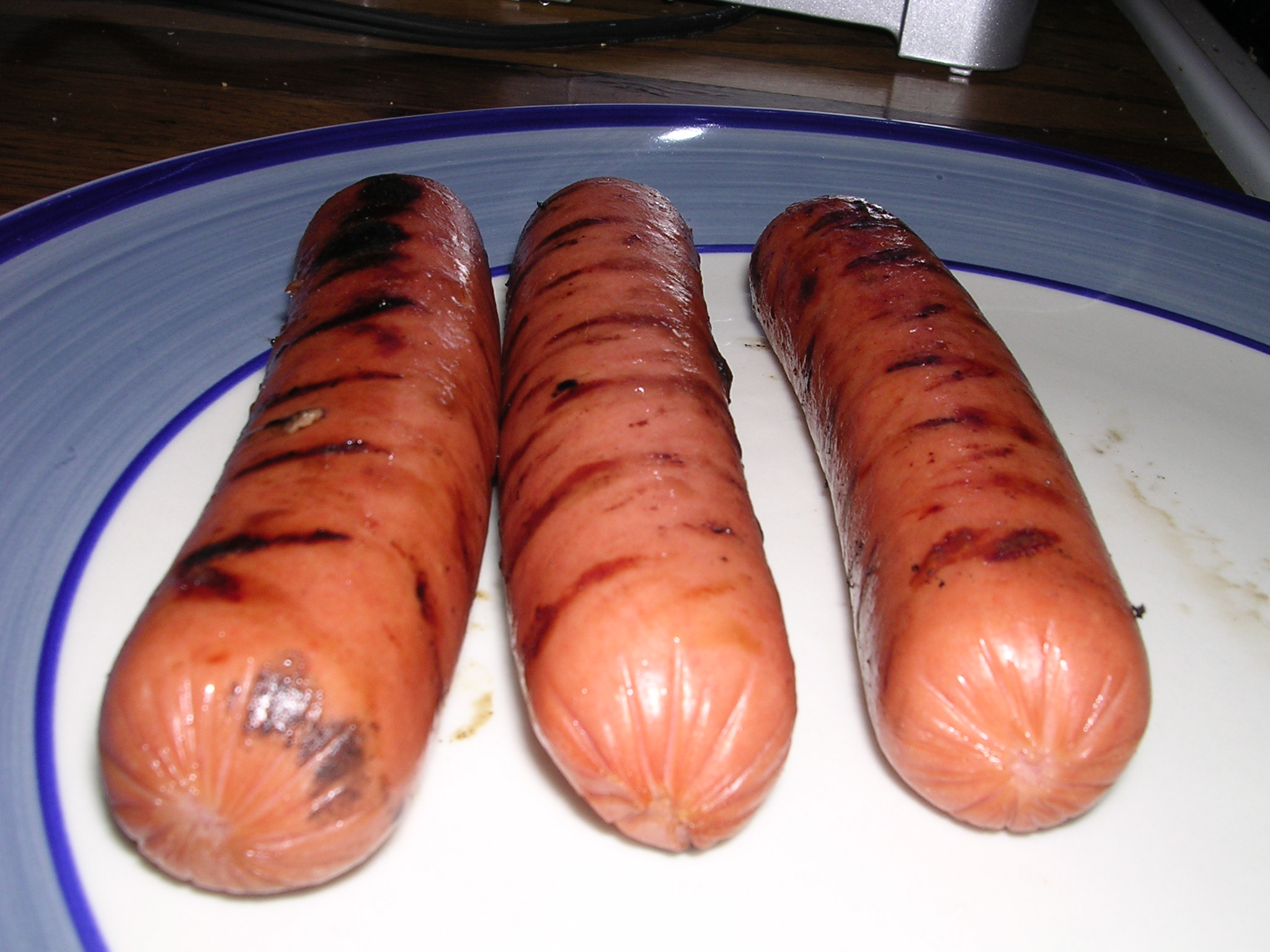
Grilled hot dogs

=== Ingredients ===
Common hot dog sausage ingredients include:

- Meat trimmings and fat
- Flavorings, such as salt, garlic, and paprika
- Preservatives (cure) – typically sodium erythorbate and sodium nitrite

Pork and beef are the traditional meats used in hot dogs. Less expensive hot dogs are often made from chicken or turkey, using low-cost mechanically separated poultry. Changes in meat technology and dietary preferences have led manufacturers to lower the salt content and use turkey, chicken, and vegetarian meat substitutes.

=== Commercial preparation ===
Hormel hot dogs going into a smoker (1964)

Hot dogs are prepared commercially by mixing the ingredients (meats, spices, binders and fillers) in vats where rapidly moving blades grind and mix the ingredients in the same operation. This mixture is forced through tubes into casings for cooking. Most hot dogs sold in the US are "skinless" rather than "natural casing" sausages.

==== Natural casing ====
As with most sausages, hot dogs must be in a casing to be cooked. Traditional casing is made from the small intestines of sheep. The products are known as "natural casing" hot dogs or frankfurters. These hot dogs have firmer texture and a "snap" that releases juices and flavor when the product is bitten.

Kosher casings are expensive in commercial quantities in the US, so kosher hot dogs are usually skinless or made with reconstituted collagen casings.

==== Skinless ====
"Skinless" hot dogs use a casing for cooking, but the casing may be a long tube of thin cellulose that is removed between cooking and packaging, a process invented in Chicago in 1925 by Erwin O. Freund, founder of Visking.

The first skinless hot dog casings were produced by Freund's new company under the name "Nojax", short for "no jackets" and sold to local Chicago sausage makers.

Skinless hot dogs vary in surface texture, but have a softer "bite" than with natural casing. Skinless hot dogs are more uniform in shape and size and cheaper to make than natural casing hot dogs.

=== Home consumption ===
Hot dogs may be prepared and served in various ways. They can be grilled, steamed, boiled, broiled, pan-fried, or cooked in an air fryer. Some home cooks cut their hot dogs into spirals before grilling or pan frying to increase the surface area, which allows for a better maillard reaction, and also creates pockets to retain filling and lengthens the hot dog, which better fills a commercial bun.

Typically it is served in a hot dog bun with various condiments and toppings. The sausage itself may be sliced and added to other dishes such as beanie weinie or filipino spaghetti.

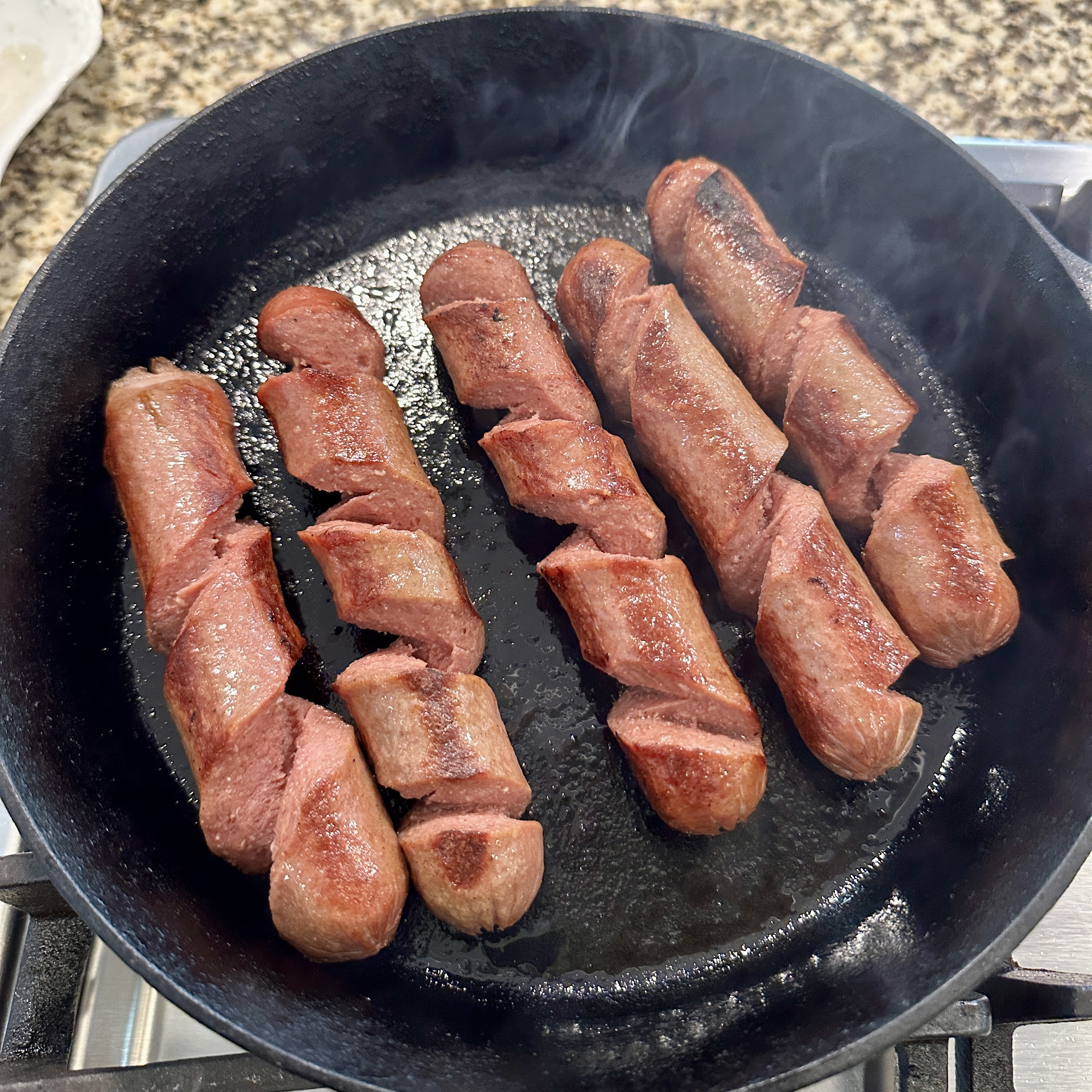
Spiral-sliced hot dogs

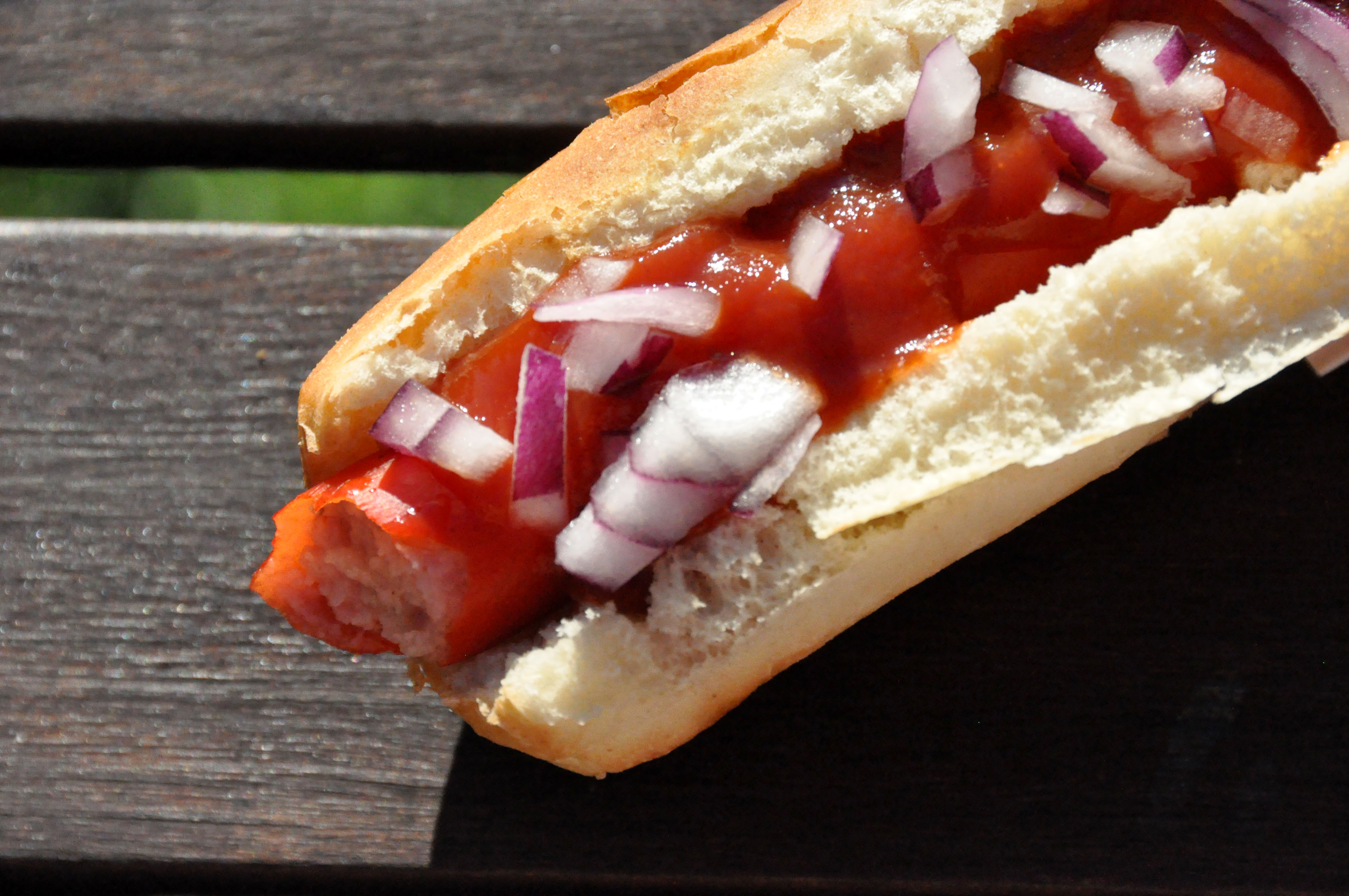
Hot dog garnished with ketchup and onions

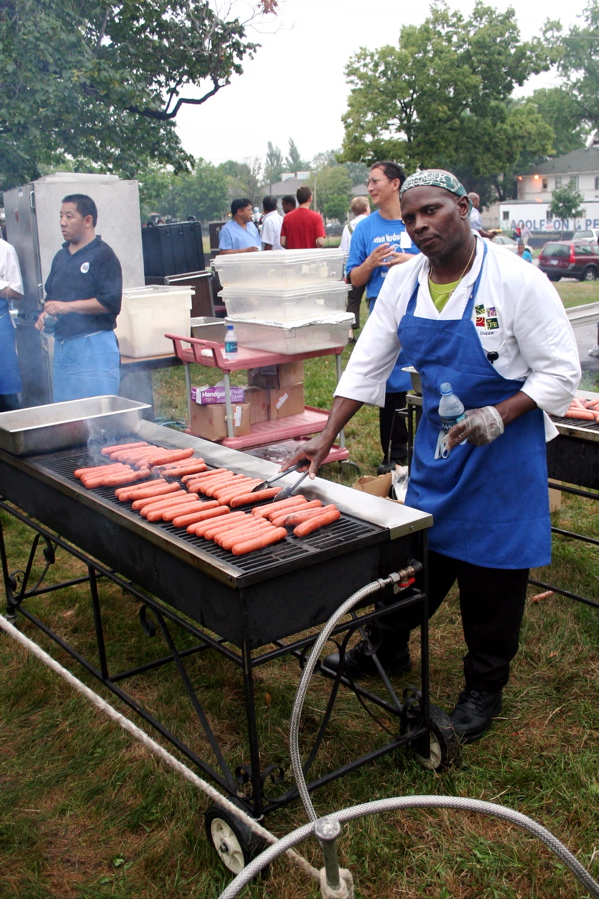
Hot dogs being grilled outside

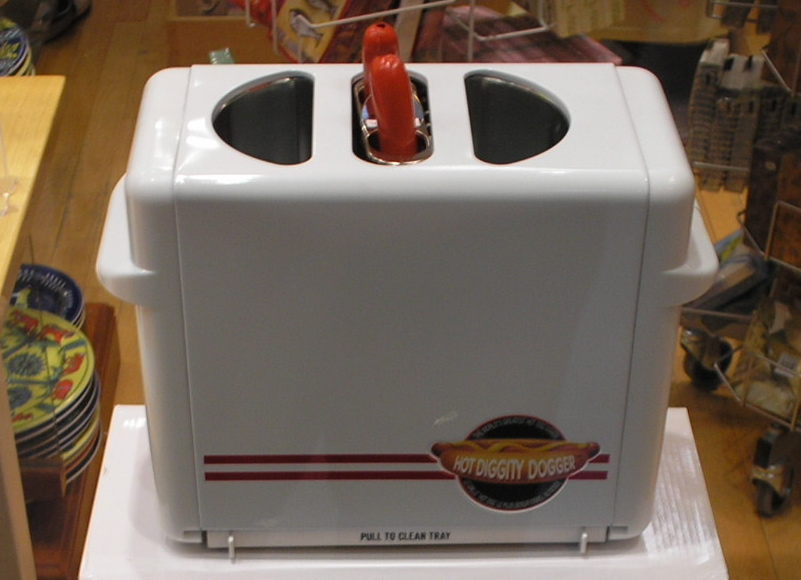
Toaster for hot dog buns that grills hot dogs at the same time

=== Sandwich debate ===
There is an ongoing debate about whether a hot dog, fully assembled in its bun with condiments, fits the description of a sandwich. Merriam-Webster has stated that a hot dog is indeed a sandwich. In 2015, the National Hot Dog and Sausage Council (NHDSC), on the other hand, declared that a hot dog is not a sandwich. Hot dog eating champions Joey Chestnut and Takeru Kobayashi agree with the NHDSC, as does Nathan's Famous, the host of a significant hot dog eating contest.

United States Supreme Court justice Ruth Bader Ginsburg also weighed in on the matter, stating that a hot dog might be categorized as a sandwich, but ultimately it comes down to the definition of a sandwich. She went on to acknowledge that a hot dog bun is a single roll that is not sliced all the way through, and in that way is similar to a submarine sandwich.

== Health risks ==
United States Department of Agriculture 1964 film on hot dog and other meat inspection

Although hot dogs are cooked during manufacture, it is still recommended that packaged hot dogs be heated to an internal temperature of at least 165 °F (75 °C) before consumption.

Hot dogs are a form of processed meat. According to the International Agency for Research on Cancer (IARC), processed meat causes cancer, particularly colorectal cancer. Most hot dogs contain nitrite and/or nitrate preservatives, which react with amines in meat to form carcinogenic N-nitroso compounds. Hot dogs are also high in fat and salt.

An American Institute for Cancer Research (AICR) report found that consuming one daily 50-gram serving of processed meat—about one hot dog—increases long-term risk of colorectal cancer by 20%. Thus, eating a hot dog every day would increase the probability of developing colorectal cancer by 5.8–7%. The AICR's warning campaign has been criticized as being "attack ads" by conservative news organization Fox News. The Cancer Project group filed a class-action lawsuit demanding warning labels on packages and at sporting events.

Due to their size, shape, and ubiquitous consumption, hot dogs present a significant choking risk, especially for children. A study in the US found that 17% of food-related asphyxiations among children younger than 10 years of age were caused by hot dogs. The risk of choking on a hot dog is greatly reduced by slicing it. It has been suggested that redesigning the size, shape, and texture of hot dogs would reduce the risk of choking.

== In the United States ==
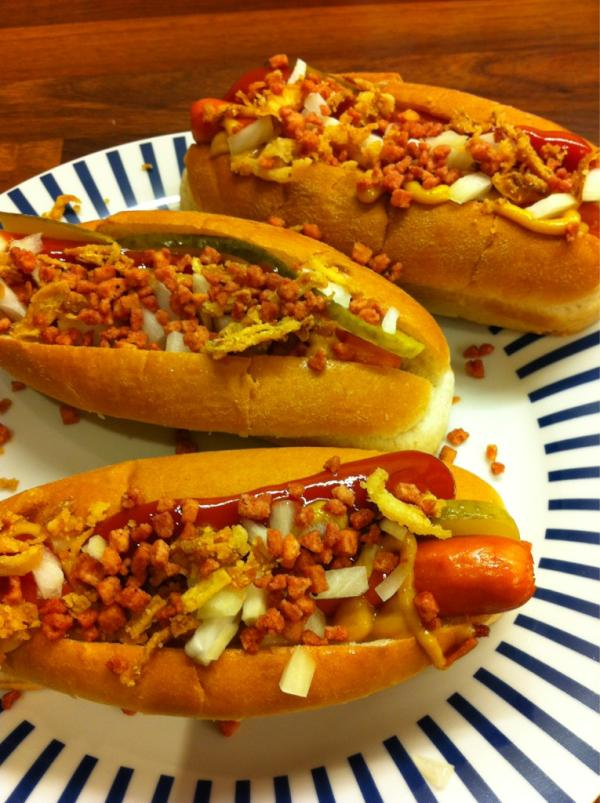
Hot dogs with ketchup, mustard, raw onion, fried onion, artificial bacon bits, and sliced pickle

Hot dogs are a traditional element of American food culture, having obtained significant cultural and patriotic status from their association with public events and sports since the 1920s. Cultural traditions include the Nathan's Hot Dog Eating Contest and the Oscar Mayer Wienermobile.

In the US, the term hot dog refers to both the sausage by itself and the combination of sausage and bun. Many nicknames applying to either have emerged over the years, including frankfurter, frank, wiener, weenie, coney, and red hot. Annually, Americans consume 20 billion hot dogs.

=== Restaurants ===
Stands and trucks sell boiled hot dogs at street and highway locations. Wandering hot dog vendors sell their product in baseball parks. At convenience stores, hot dogs are kept heated on rotating grills. Hot dogs are also common on restaurants' children's menus. Costco, a big-box retail chain, sells a yearly average of 135 million hot dogs at its food courts, at a notably low price. Fast-food restaurant chains typically do not carry hot dogs because of its shorter shelf-life, more complex toppings and cooking, and mismatched consumer expectations. There are also restaurants where hot dogs are a specialty.

=== Condiments ===
Hot dogs are commonly served with one or more condiments. In 2005, the US-based National Hot Dog & Sausage Council (part of the American Meat Institute) found mustard to be the most popular, preferred by 32% of respondents; 23% favored ketchup; 17% chili; 9% pickle relish, and 7% onions. Other toppings include sauerkraut, mayonnaise, lettuce, tomato, cheese, and chili peppers.

Condiment preferences vary across the U.S. Southerners showed the strongest preference for chili, while Midwesterners showed the greatest affinity for ketchup.

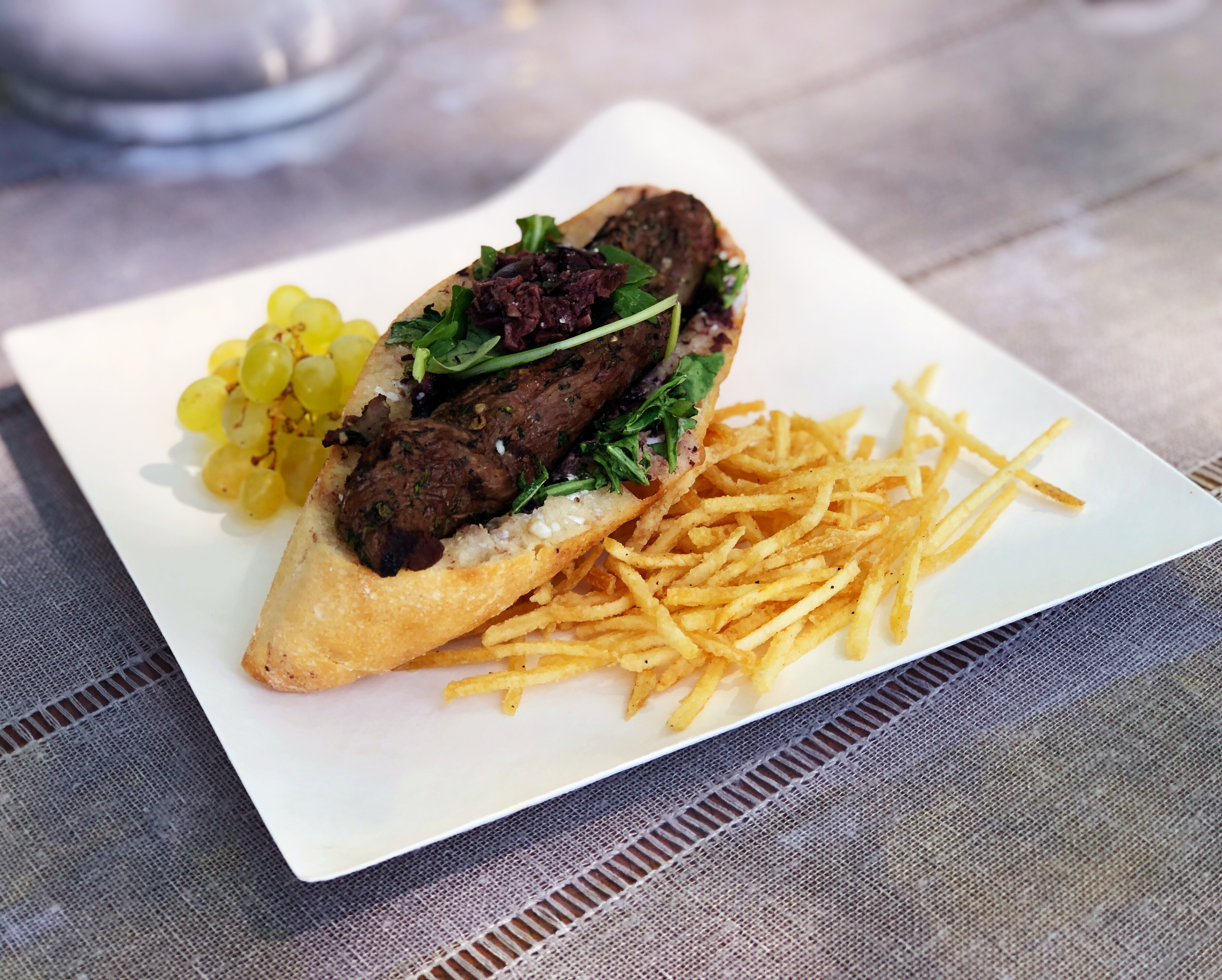
A hot dog made from lamb in Sonoma, California

=== Variations ===
American hot dog variations often have misleading names; they are commonly named for the geographical regions that allegedly inspired them instead of the regions in which they are most popular. For example, Michigan hot dogs and white hots are popular in upstate New York, whereas Coney Island hot dogs are popular in Michigan.

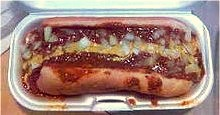
A Michigan hot dog, an all-beef hot dog on a steamed bun topped with a meaty sauce

Sauteed bell peppers, onions, and potatoes find their way into New Jersey's deep-fried Italian hot dog. Hot wieners, or weenies, are a staple in Rhode Island where they are sold at restaurants under the misleading name "New York System". Texas hot dogs are spicy variants found in upstate New York and Pennsylvania (and as "all the way dogs" in New Jersey), but not Texas. In the Philadelphia metro area, Texas Tommy refers to a hot dog variant in which the frank is topped with melted cheese (often cheddar) and wrapped in bacon. In the Midwest, the Chicago-style hot dog is served on a poppy seed bun and topped with mustard, fresh tomatoes, onions, "sport peppers", bright green relish, dill pickles, and celery salt.

The "New York dog" or "New York style" hot dog is a natural-casing all-beef frank topped with sauerkraut and spicy brown mustard, onions optional, invented and popularized in New York City.

Some baseball parks have signature hot dogs, such as Dodger Dogs at Dodger Stadium in Los Angeles, and Fenway Franks at Fenway Park in Boston.

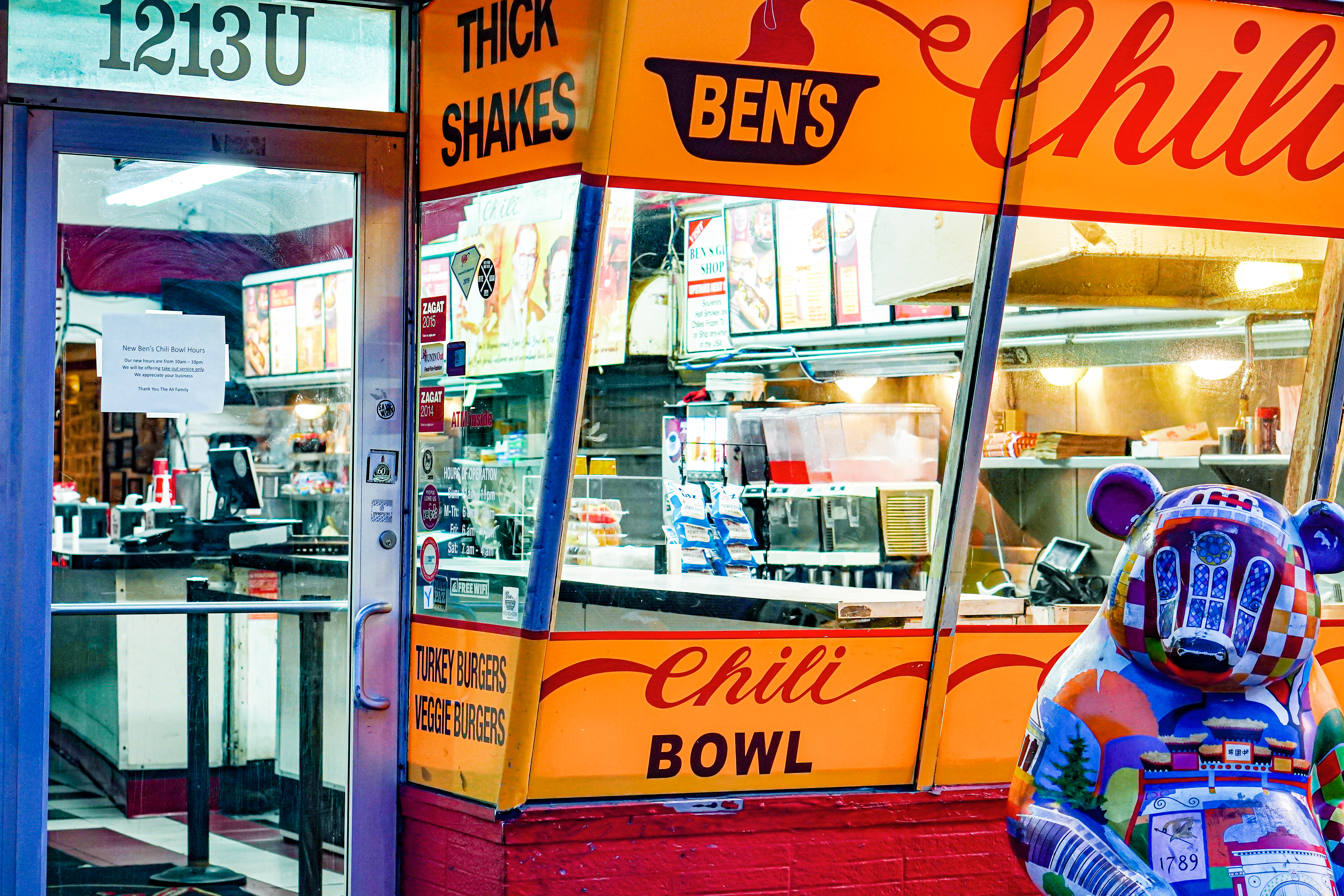
Ben's Chili Bowl in Washington, D.C., sells the half-smoke.

Washington, D.C., is home to the half-smoke, a half beef, half pork sausage that is both grilled and smoked. A half-smoke is often placed into a hot dog-style bun and topped with chili, cheese, onions, and mustard, similar to a chili dog. Among the famous half-smoke restaurants in the Washington area include Ben's Chili Bowl, which is a cultural landmark, and Weenie Beenie in Arlington County, Virginia.

== In Canada ==
Skinner's Restaurant, in Lockport, Manitoba, is reputed to be Canada's oldest hot dog outlet in continuous operation, founded in 1929 by Jim Skinner Sr. Hot dogs served at Skinner's are European style foot-long (30.5 cm) hot dogs with natural casings, manufactured by Winnipeg Old Country Sausage in Winnipeg, Manitoba.

== Outside North America ==
In most of the world, a "hot dog" is recognized as a sausage in a bun, but the type varies considerably. The name is often applied to something that would not be described as a hot dog in North America. For example, in New Zealand a "hot dog" is a battered sausage, often on a stick, which is known as a corn dog in North America; an "American hot dog" is the version in a bun.

=== Gallery ===
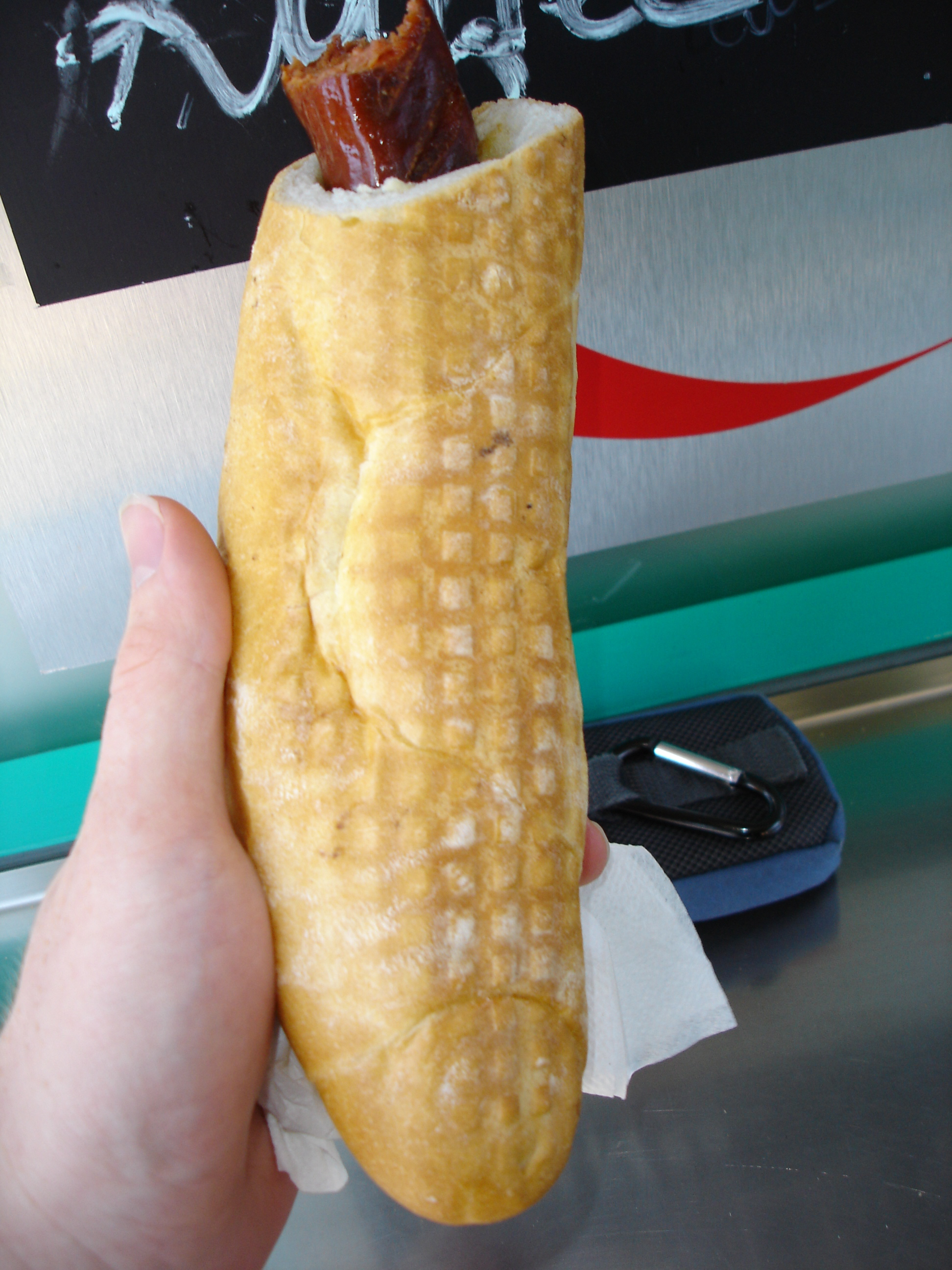
A French "hot dog" can use a hollowed-out baguette as the bread.

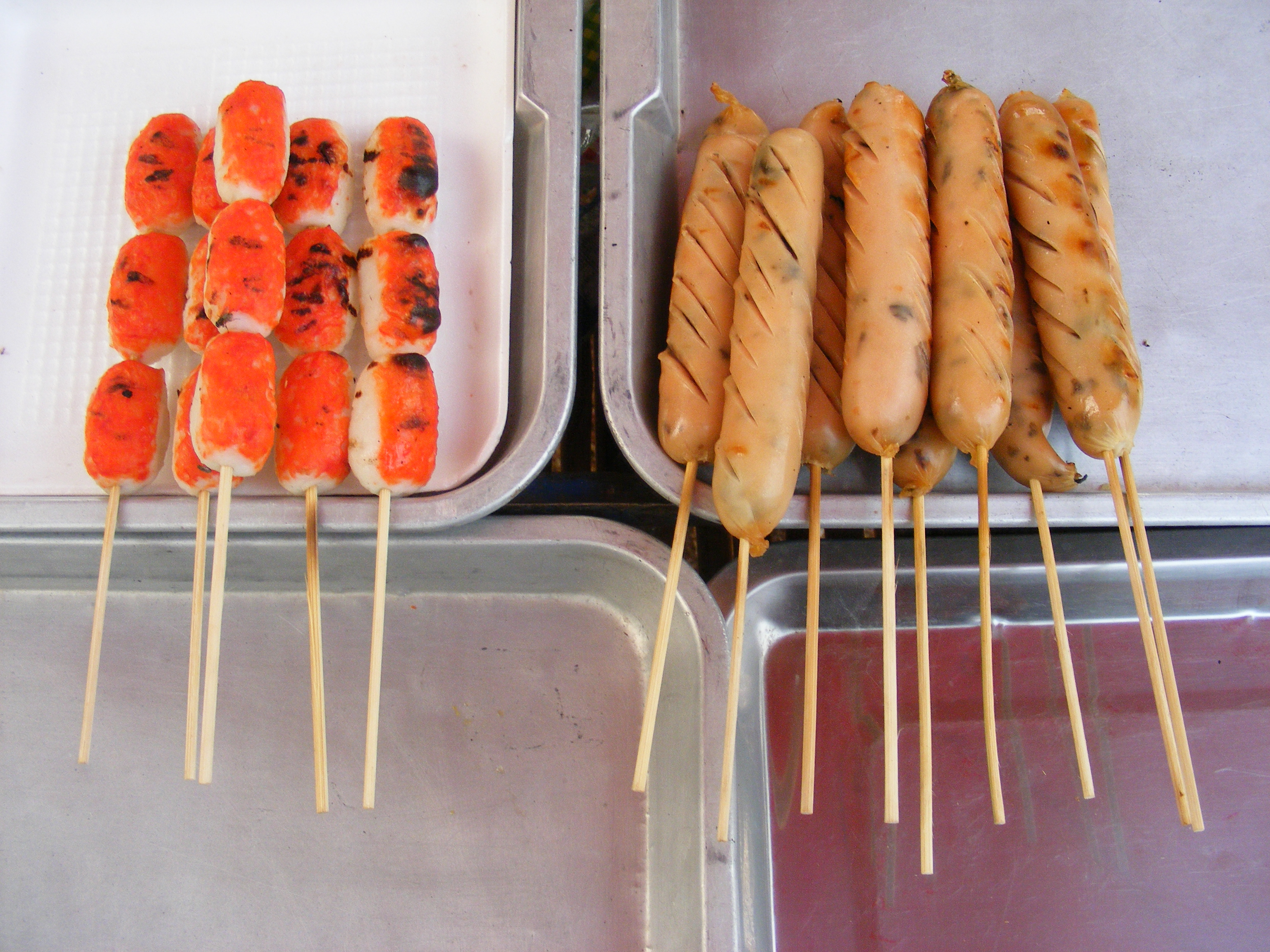
Grilled sausages on sticks for sale in Thailand

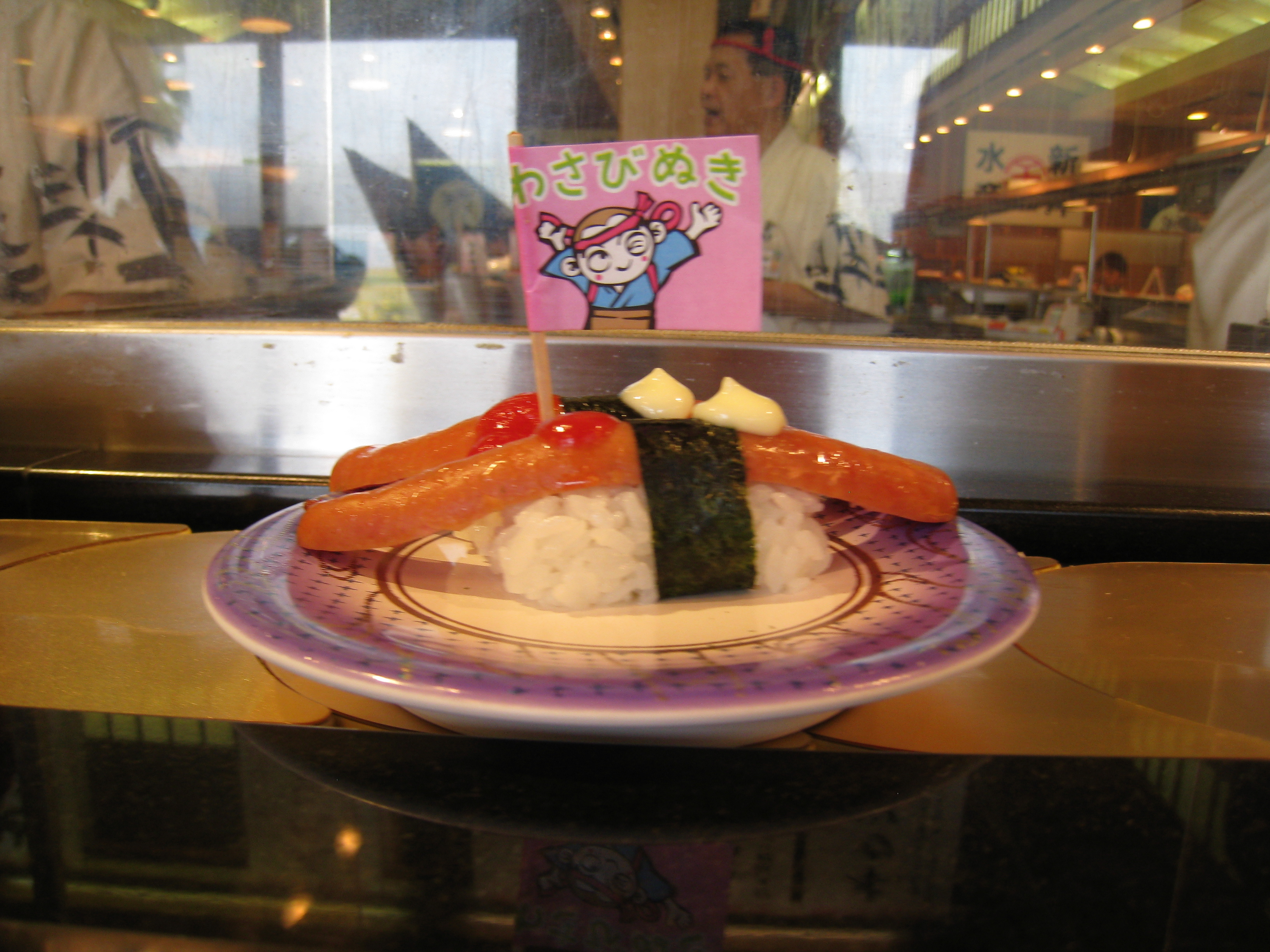
Hot dog sushi

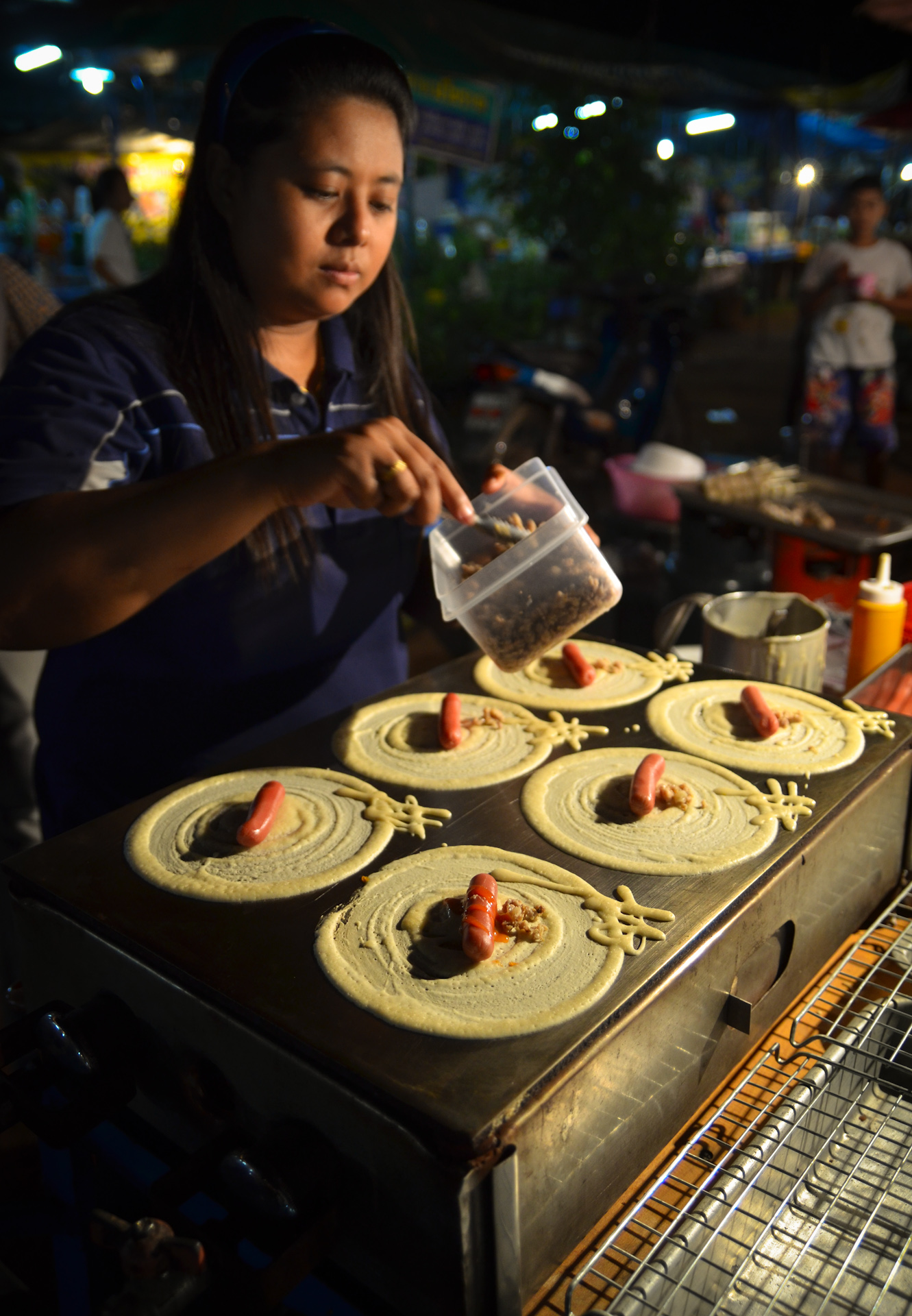
Thai khanom Tokiao being prepared, a Thai style crêpe with a hot dog sausage, at a night market

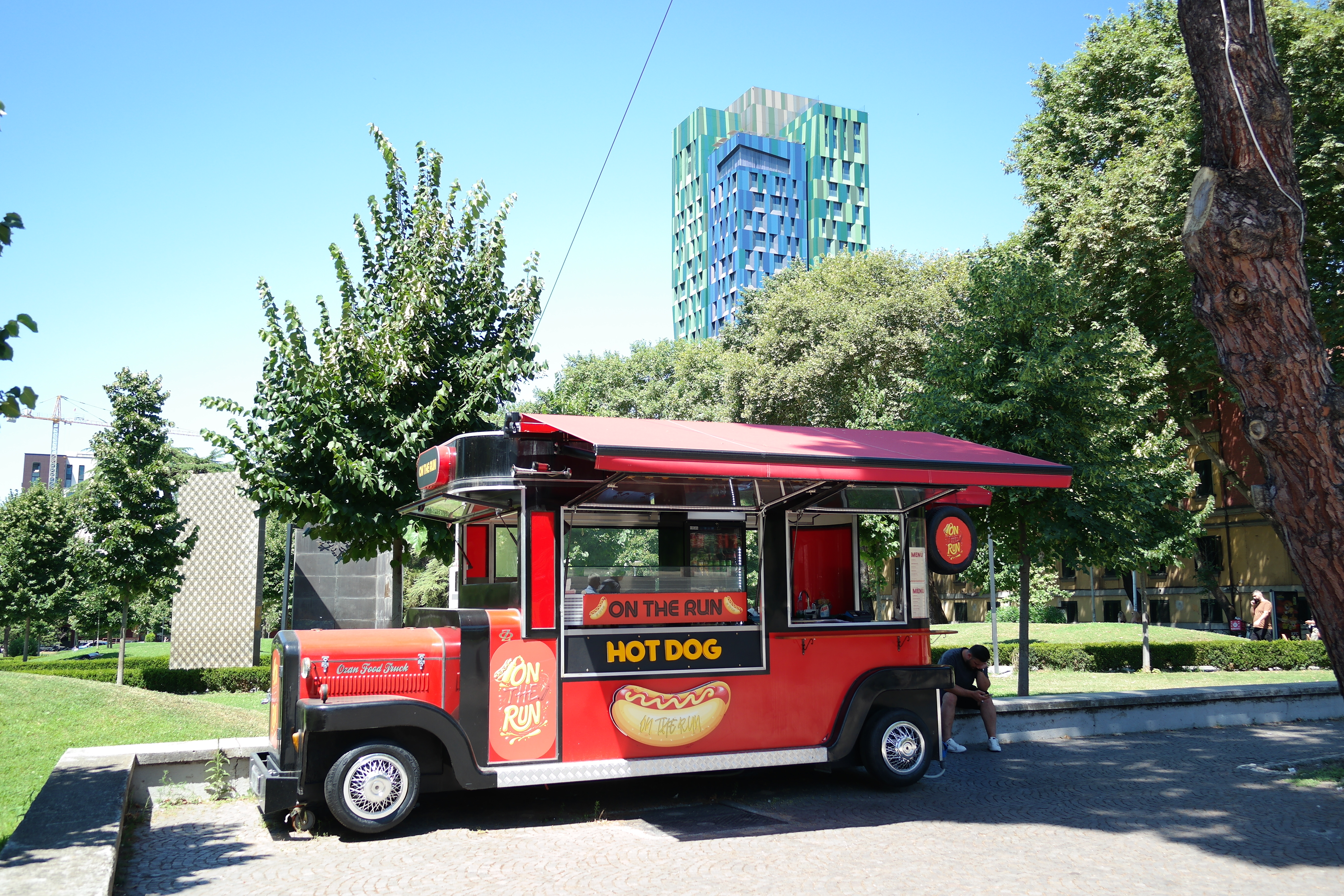
Hot dog truck in Tirana, Albania

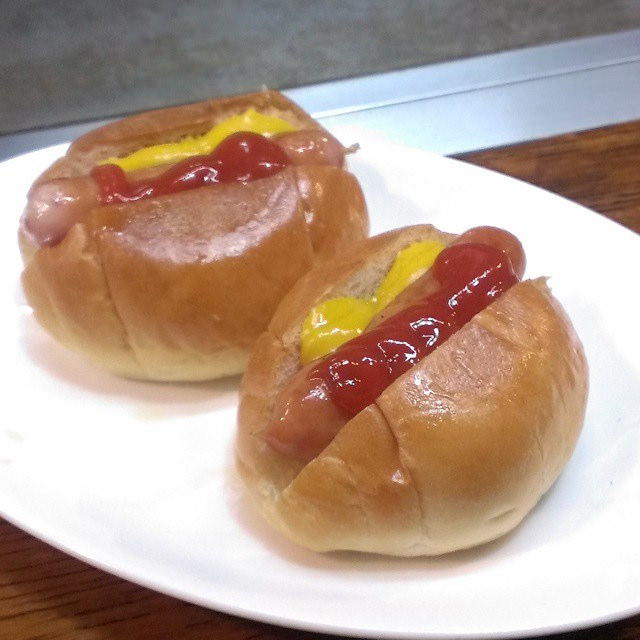
Miniature hot dogs in Japan

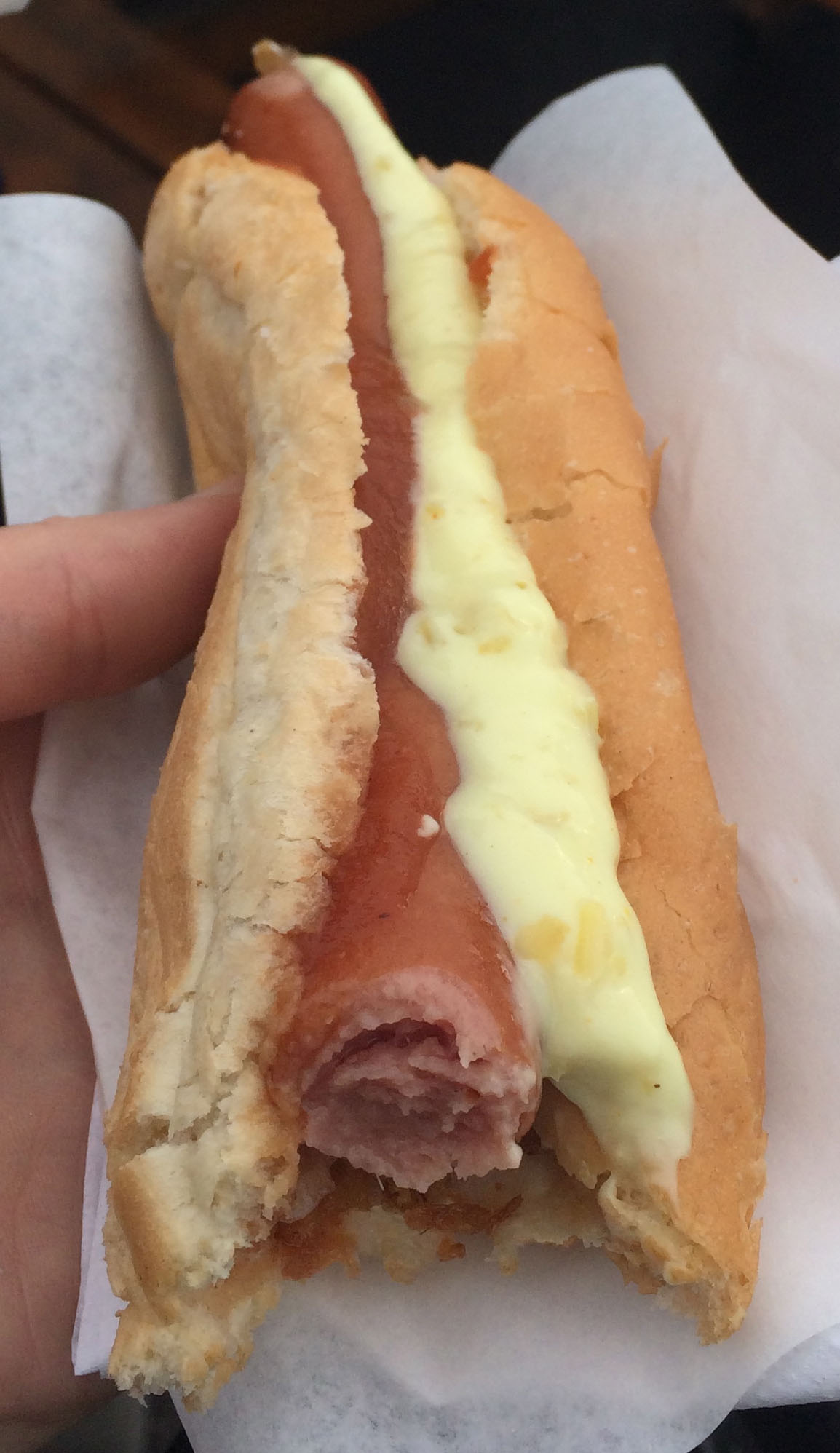
Hot dog from Bæjarins Beztu Pylsur in Iceland

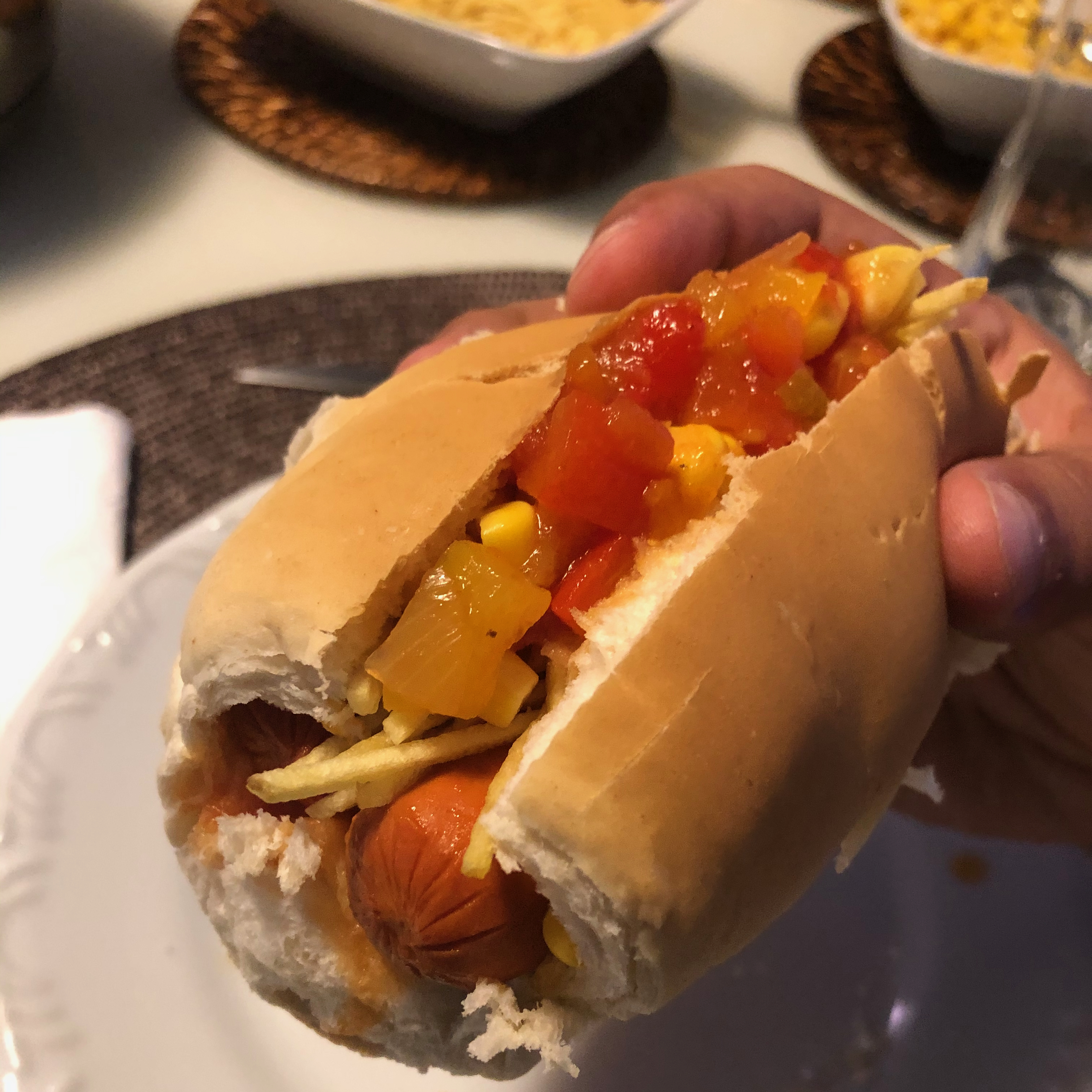
In Brazil, a cachorro quente is served on a bread roll with a tomato-based broth, corn, and potato sticks.

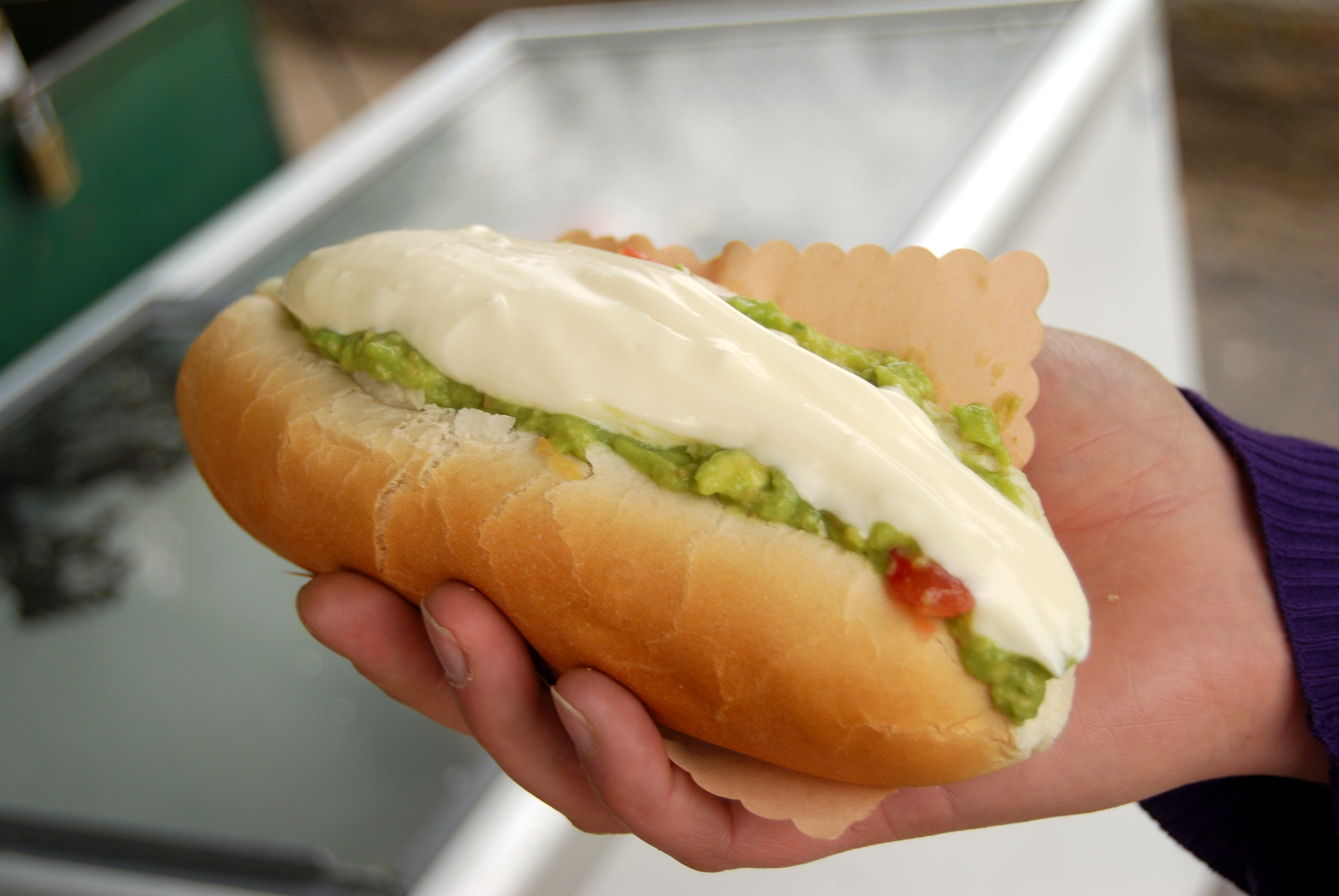
The completo, a Chilean version of hot dog with additional sausages

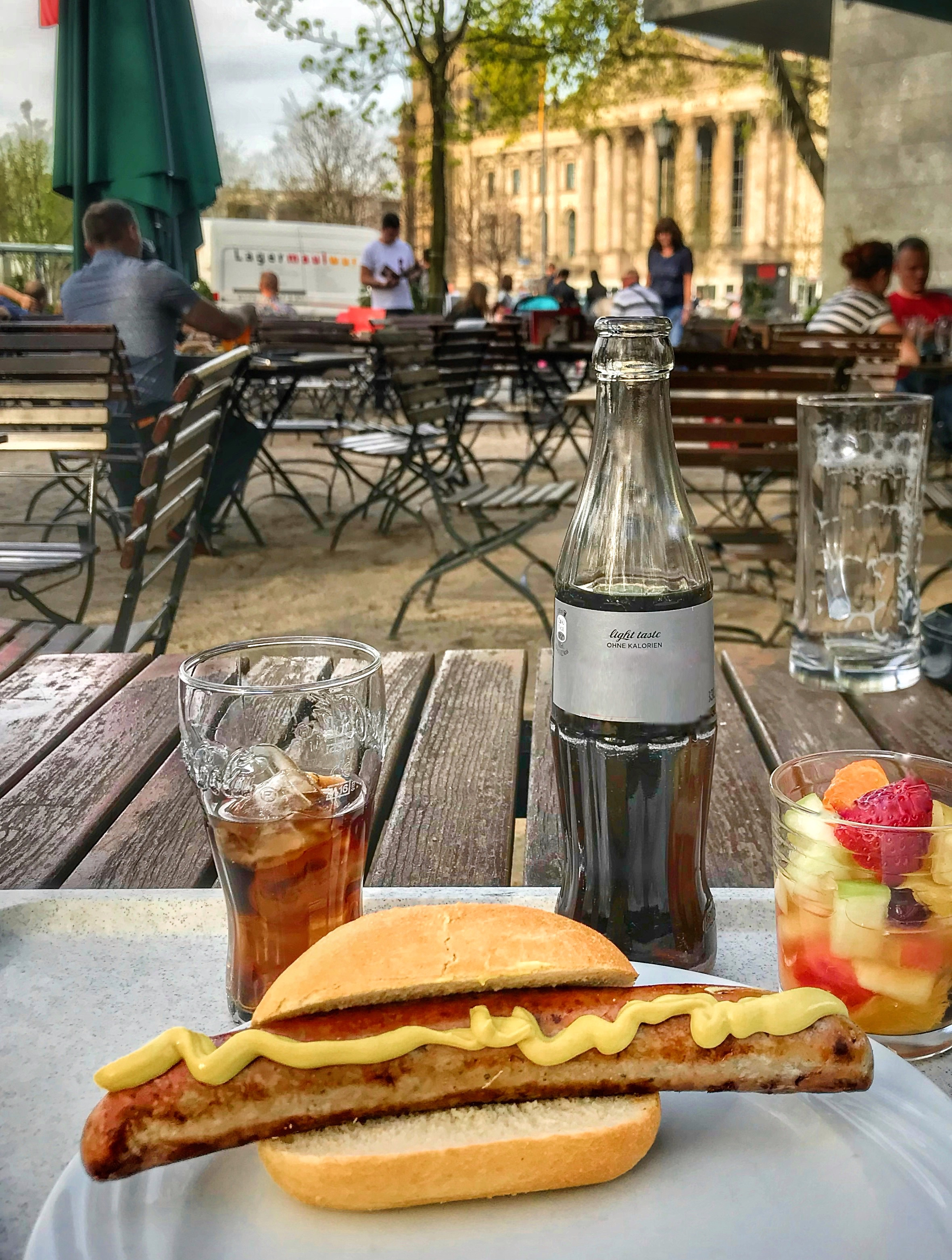
In Germany, the sausages from hot dogs are heated in a kettle of hot broth, but are also often grilled, then served in a crunchy bun. The German term for this grilled street food is "Bockwurst" or "Bratwurst im Brötchen".

== Records ==
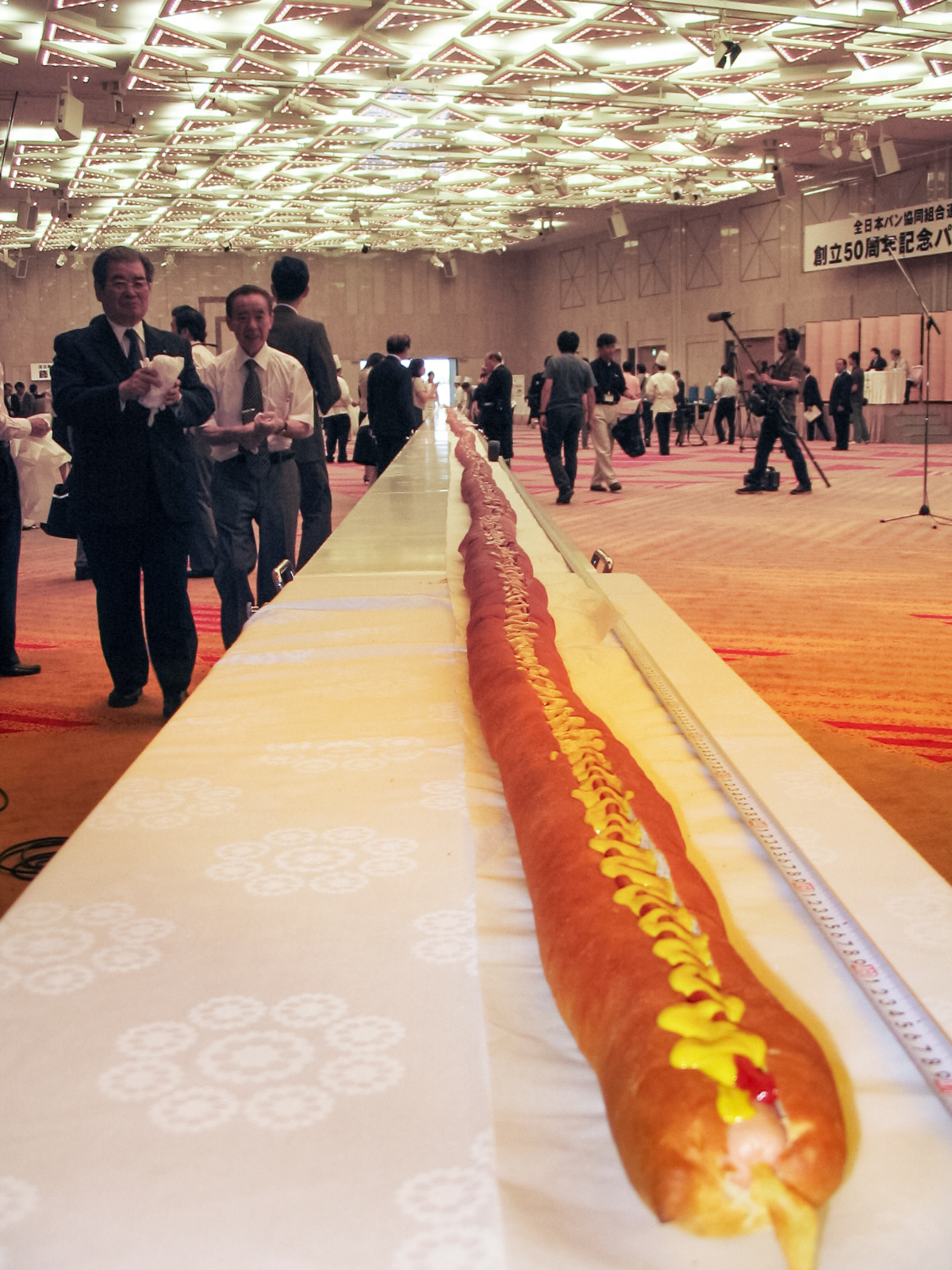
Pictured in August 2006, the world's longest hot dog stretched 60 meters (197 ft).

The world's longest hot dog had been 60 meters (197 ft) long and rested within a 60.3-meter (198 ft) bun. The hot dog was prepared by Shizuoka Meat Producers for the All-Japan Bread Association, which baked the bun and coordinated the event, including official measurement for the world record. The hot dog and bun were the center of a media event in celebration of the Association's 50th anniversary on August 4, 2006, at the Akasaka Prince Hotel in Tokyo.

On May 31, 2012, Guinness World Records certified the world record for the most expensive hot dog at US$145.49. The "California Capitol City Dawg", served at Capitol Dawg in Sacramento, California, features a grilled 460 mm (18 in) all-beef, natural-casing frank from Chicago, served on a fresh-baked herb-and-oil focaccia roll, spread with white truffle butter, then grilled. It is topped with whole-grain mustard from France, garlic and herb mayonnaise, sauteed chopped shallots, organic mixed baby greens, maple syrup-marinated and fruitwood-smoked uncured bacon from New Hampshire, chopped tomato, moose cheese from Sweden, sweetened dried cranberries, basil olive oil and pear-cranberry-coconut balsamic vinaigrette, and ground peppercorn. Proceeds from the sale of each 1.4 kg (3 lb) super dog were donated to the Shriners Hospitals for Children.

Hot dogs are a popular food for eating competitions. The record for hot dogs eaten in 10 minutes is 83 by Joey Chestnut at the "Chestnut vs. Kobayashi: Unfinished Beef" event on September 2, 2024. The last person to hold the record before Chestnut was Takeru Kobayashi. Competitive eater Miki Sudo holds the record for most hot dogs eaten in 10 minutes by a female at 48.5 hot dogs, also setting this record on July 4, 2020. The last person to hold the record before Sudo was Sonya Thomas.

== See also ==
- Hot dog variations
- Breakfast roll
- Poorman's Meal
- List of hot dogs
- List of hot dog restaurants
