= Viskase =

American manufacturer

Viskase Companies, Inc
- Company type: Public (OTC Pink Limited: VKSC)
- Industry: Food service manufacturing
- Founded: 1925
- Founder: Erwin O. Freund
- Headquarters: Lombard, Illinois, United States
- Area served: Worldwide
- Key people: Tim Feast, CEO
- Products: Food casings
- Total assets: $203,542,000 (2006)
- Number of employees: 2,100
- Website: http://www.viskase.com

Viskase (formerly Visking) is a global corporation based out of Lombard, Illinois, United States, that supplies plastic, cellulose, and fibrous film and packaging to the food service industry, including casings for processed meats such as hot dogs and sausages. Viskase has manufacturing facilities in the United States, Mexico, Brazil and France, as well as sales offices located around the world.

Viskase is a publicly traded company, using the stock symbol OTC Pink Limited: VKSC.

== Company history ==
=== Origins ===
Erwin O. Freund, founder of what would become Viskase, sought a readily available replacement for animal intestine casing. Upon creating a cellulose casing, using the "viscose" process (also used in rayon) he realized the product stuffed well, linked, and was able to withstand the smokehouse. Quite by accident, he discovered that when the casing was removed from the product the sausages retained their shape and were firm. This was the beginning of the skinless frankfurter or hot dog.

In the 1950s, Visking Corporation became a division of Union Carbide.

== Products ==
- Fibrous
- LCC
- MEMBRA-CEL
- NOJAX
- POLYJAX
- VISCOAT Smoke Master & Color Master
- VISFLEX
- VISMAX

== See also ==
- Dialysis tubing
