= Franz Bakery =

American bakery chain

United States Bakery
- Type: Private
- Industry: Food processing
- Founded: 1906; 120 years ago
- Founders: Engelbert Franz; Joe Franz
- Headquarters: Portland, Oregon U.S.
- Website: franzbakery.com

United States Bakery, better known as Franz Family Bakeries, is a bread and pastry manufacturer headquartered in Portland, Oregon, United States. Franz Bakery was founded in 1906. U.S. Bakery also owns the Northwest regional bread brands Williams', Gai's, and Snyder's.

== History ==
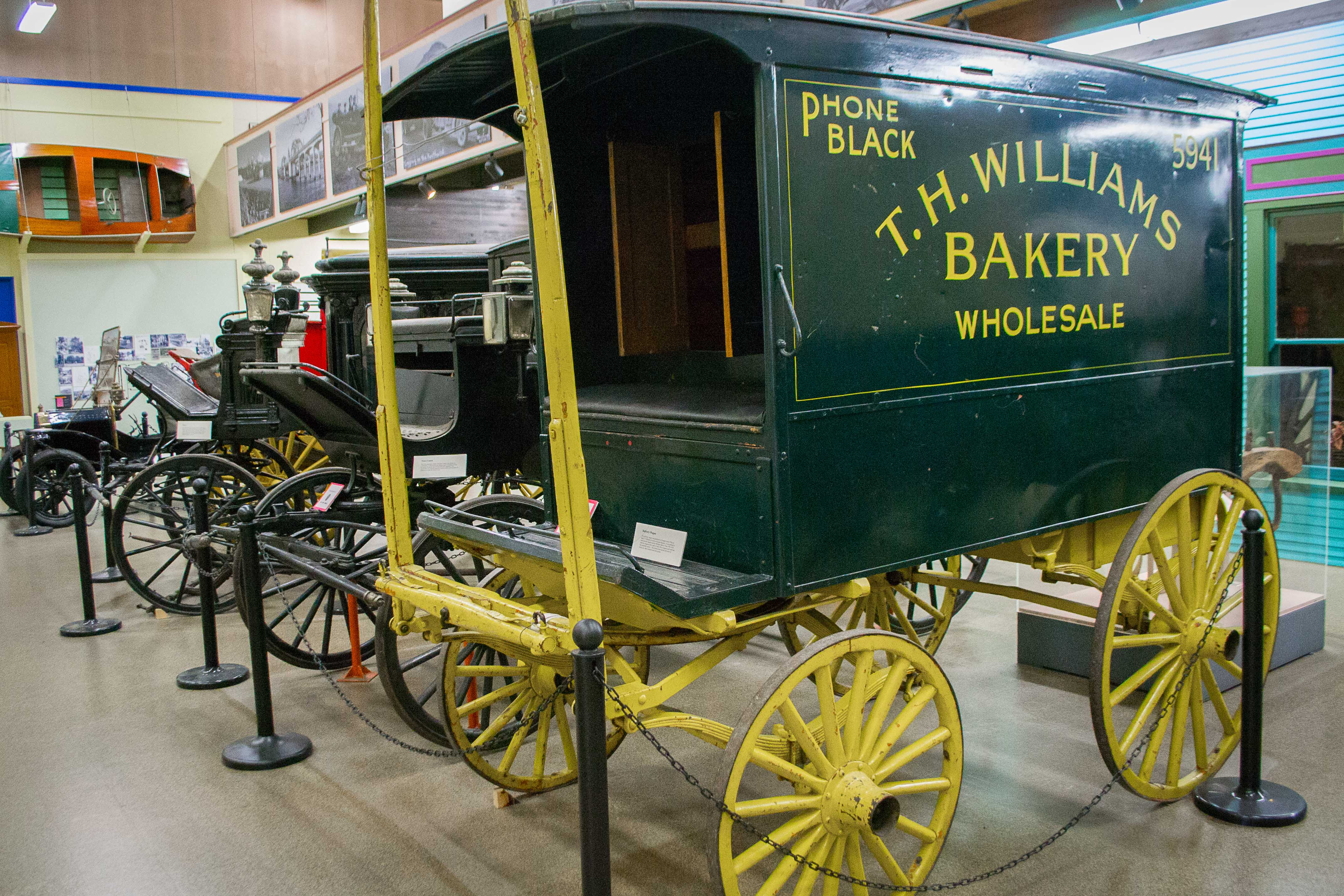
A delivery wagon painted to look like the wagons at Williams' Bakery

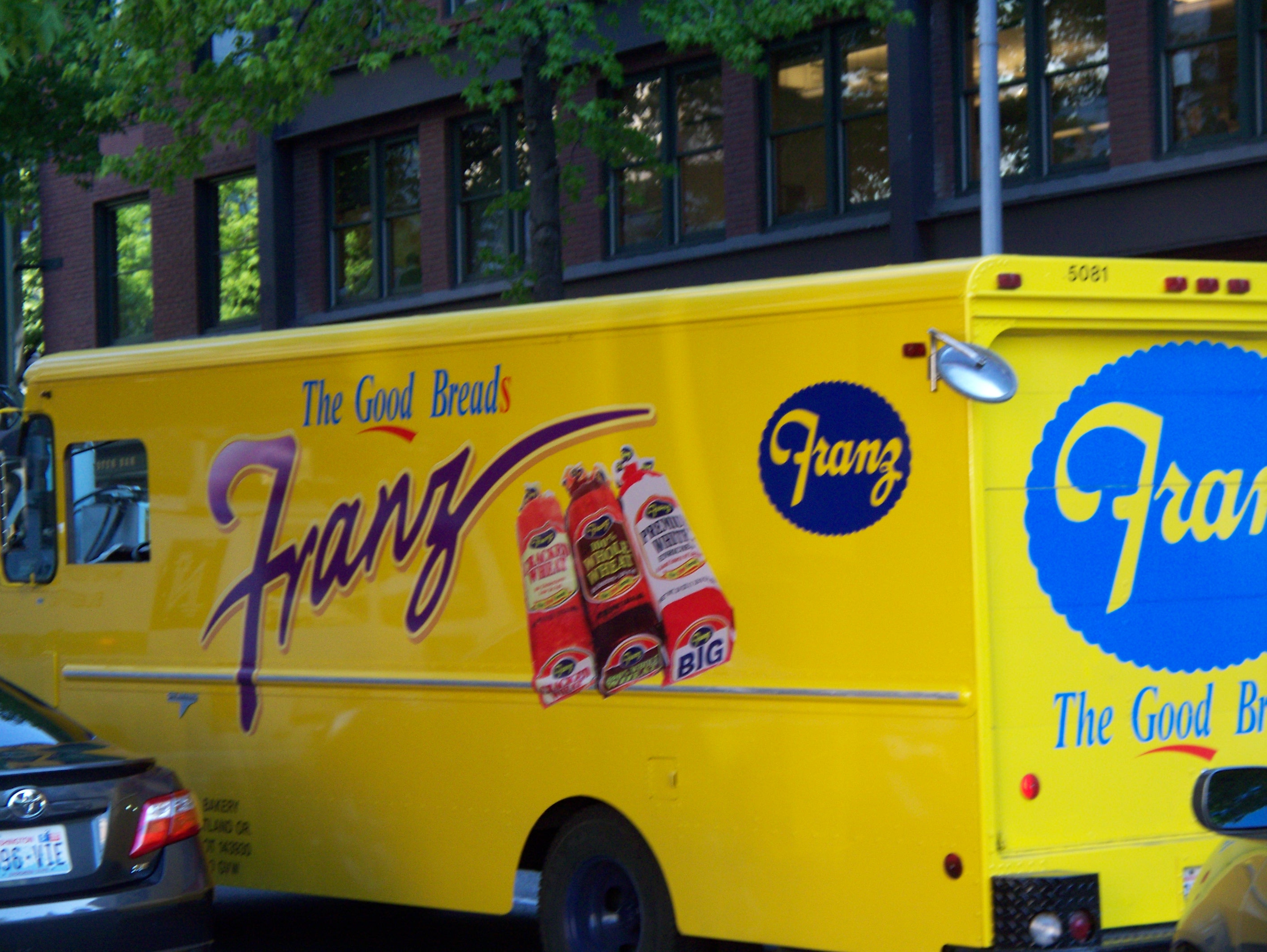
A Franz Bakery truck in Seattle

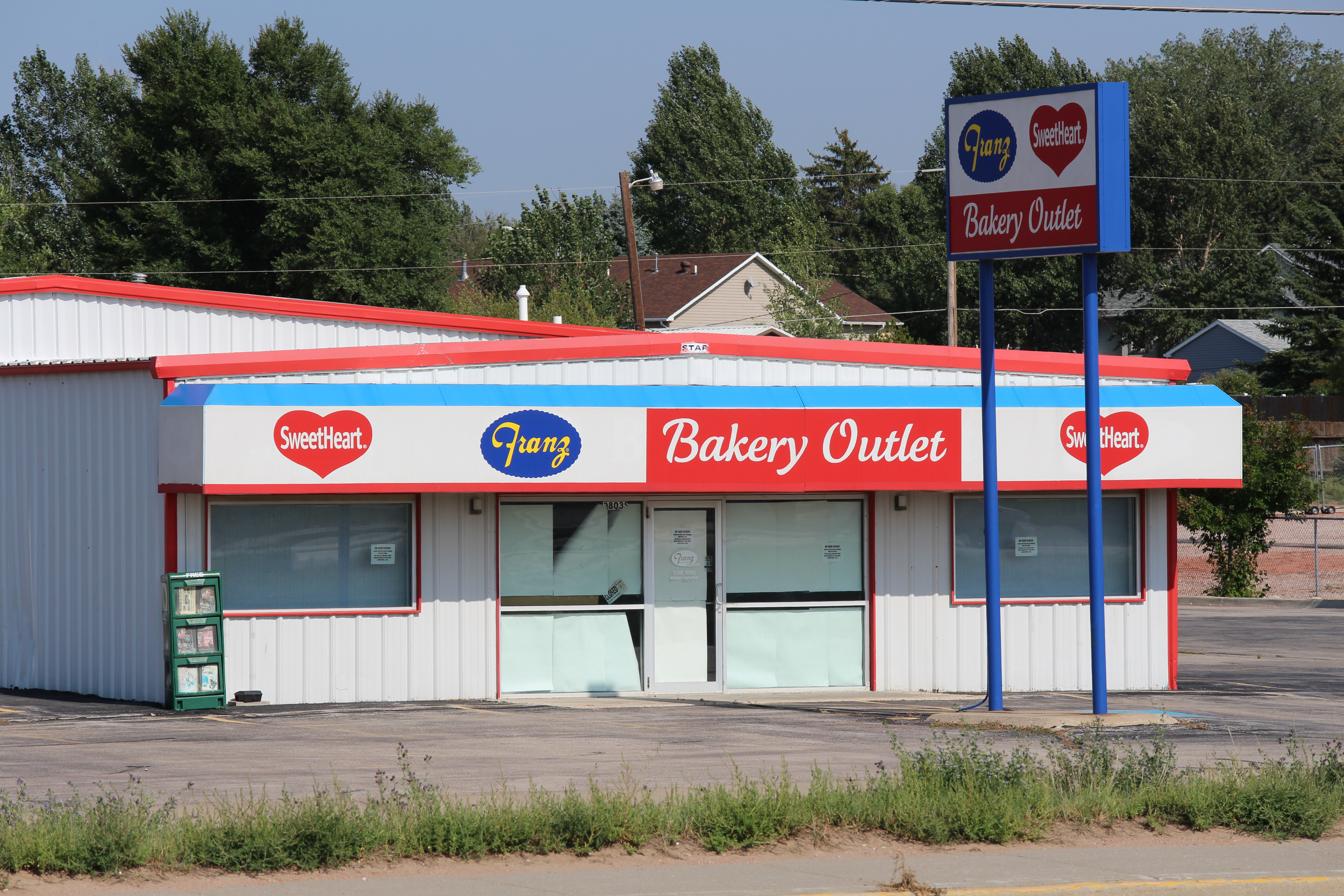
A Franz Bakery Outlet in Gillette, Wyoming

In collaboration with Engelbert Franz of Franz Bakery, W.P. Yaw of Yaw's Top Notch Restaurant invented the 5-inch (130 mm) diameter hamburger bun in the late 1920s. Though others are credited with creating a bread product to use for the first hamburgers known to the world, Franz is credited for inventing the hamburger bun in its current worldwide accepted form.

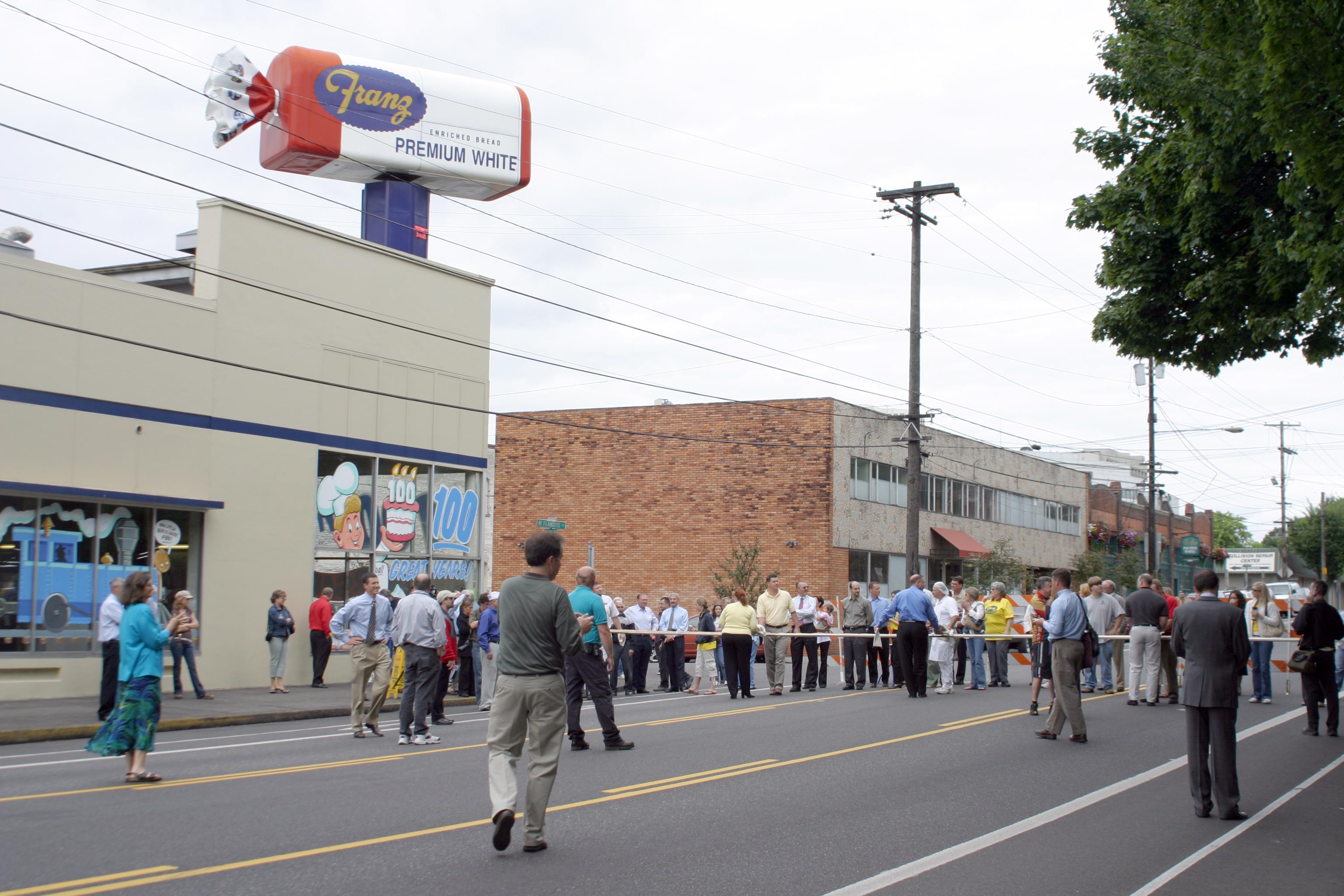
A hot dog and bun 104 ft (32 m) long in front of Franz Bakery at NE 12th and Flanders in Portland

In July 2006, Franz baked a hot dog bun 104 feet 9.5 inches (31.941 m) long, breaking the Guinness World Record for the World's longest hot dog. The previous record was just over 57 feet (17 m) and set in 2005.

=== Acquisitions ===
United States Bakery has a long history of growth through acquisition.

Date	Company
1906	Ann Arbor Bakery, Portland Oregon
1907	United States Bakery (namesake), Portland Oregon
1976	Buttercup Bakery, Gresham Oregon
1977	Pioneer Bakery, Bend Oregon
1979	Snyder's Bakery, Yakima Washington
1980	Langendorf Bakery, Portland Oregon
1981	Smith Bakery, Salem Oregon
1985	Boge Bakery, Spokane Washington
1991	Williams' Bakery, Eugene Oregon
1994	Smith Cookie Company, McMinnville Oregon
1997	Gai's Bakery, Seattle Washington
2010	Harvest Classic Bakery, Nampa Idaho
2013	Sweetheart, Eddy's, Standish Farms, and Grandma Emilie's brands from Hostess Brands
2017	United Grocers bakery facility, Los Angeles, California
2019	Rocky Mountain Bread Company and Dunford Bakers, Salt Lake City, Utah
2019	Svenhards Swedish Baker, Exeter, California
2021	Love's Bakery, Honolulu, Hawaii

In 2006, the Williams' factory, which had operated on the same site near the University of Oregon (UO) since 1908, was closed and the site sold to UO, which eventually built its current basketball venue, Matthew Knight Arena at that location. Williams' relocated to a new plant in the Glenwood area of neighboring Springfield. It was the first new bakery the firm had built from the ground up since 1906.

In 2013, United States Bakery paid $28.85 million for Hostess' Sweetheart, Eddy's, Standish Farms, and Grandma Emilie's brands.

== See also ==
- List of food companies
