= World's longest hot dog =

World record for the longest hot dog

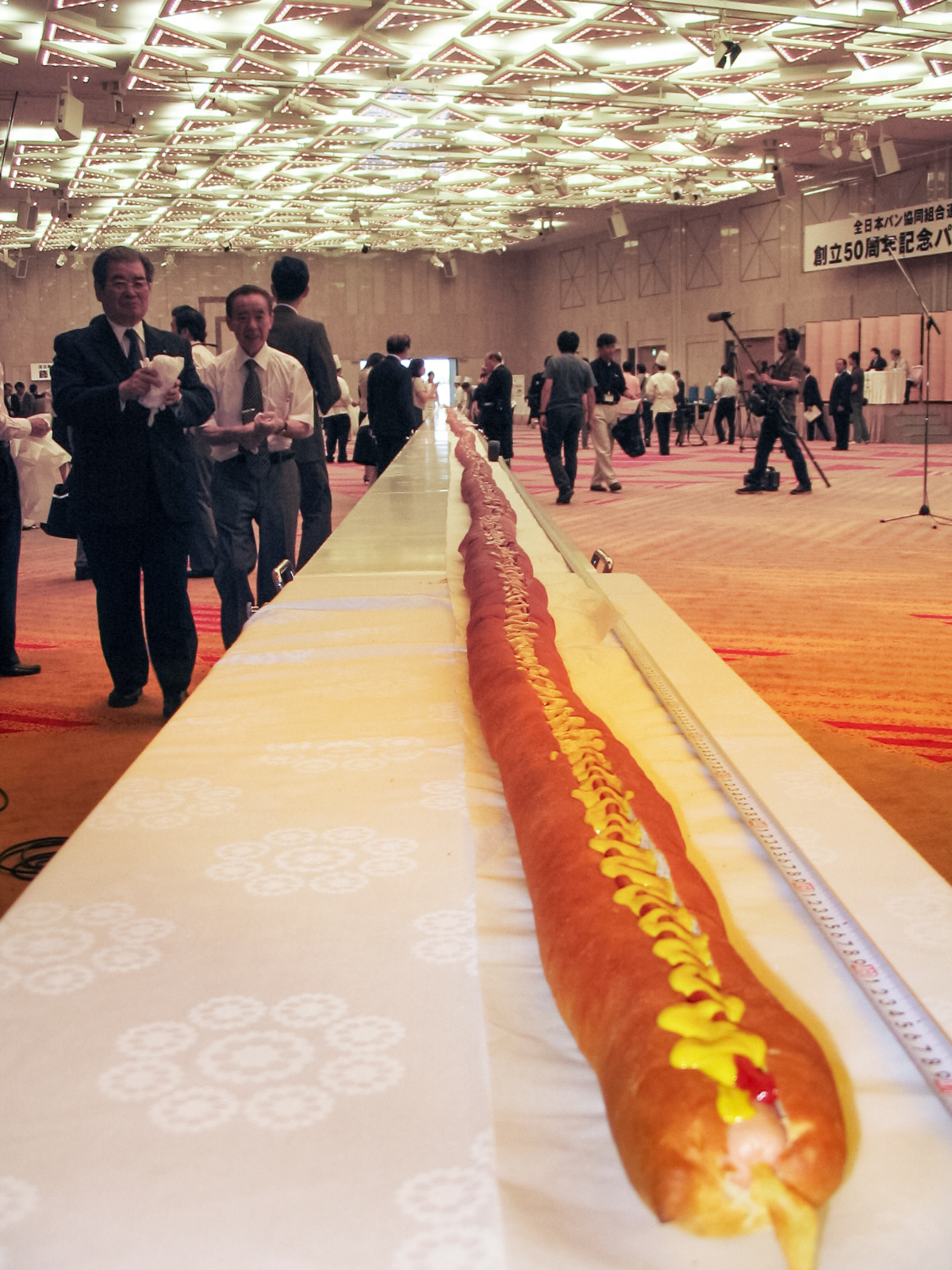
The August 2006 record-setting world's longest hot dog, at 60 metres (200 ft)

The world's longest hot dog is a world record dating back to at least 2001. The current Guinness World Record was set in Paraguay in July 2011, with a hot dog that measured 203.8 metres (669 ft) in length.

== Previous world records ==
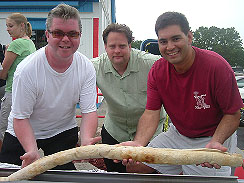
A previous world's longest hot dog (July 15, 2005).

- Sara Lee Corp. made a 1,996-foot (608 m) long hot dog in commemoration of the 1996 Summer Olympics in Atlanta. Guinness World Records does not reflect this record in any of its publications as of 2006.
- In 2001, a hot dog and bun measuring 4.65 metres (15.3 ft) was made in Pennsylvania to obtain the world record.
- On August 18, 2002, a hot dog measuring 22 feet, 8 inches, which was made by Radford University's catering department, was displayed at a party to celebrate the demolition of The Memorial Bridge, which crossed the New River in Radford, Virginia.
- On October 18, 2003, a hot dog and bun measuring 37 feet 2 inches (11.33 m) was made by students from the University of Pretoria and displayed at the Sonop Hostel, Pretoria, South Africa, to obtain the world record.
- On July 1, 2004, a hot dog and bun measuring 37.2 feet (11.3 m) was made by Vienna Beef and Rosen's Bakery for the Taste of Chicago, in celebration of National Hot Dog Month, to obtain the world record. The bun used more than 200,000 poppy seeds.
- On July 15, 2005, a hot dog and bun measuring 50 feet 7 inches (15.42 m) was made for the Great American Hot Dog Festival by Jamie Coyne in Columbus, Ohio.
- On August 14, 2005, a hot dog and bun measuring 57.5 feet (17.5 m) was made by Conshohocken Bakery and Berks Meat Packing for the 20th Annual Corvettes for Kids fundraiser at Bally (USA) to obtain the world record.
- On February 20, 2006, a hot dog and bun measuring 20 metres (66 ft) was made by the Department of Sport and Recreation of WA at the Curtin University in Perth to obtain the world record. It required 25 pounds (11 kilograms) of sausage meat, 33 kilograms (73 pounds) of dough, 10 litres (11 US quarts) of tomato sauce and mustard, and "enough onions to fill a Honda Civic."
- On July 6, 2006, a hot dog and bun measuring 104.75 feet (31.93 m) was made by the Hill Meat Company of Pendleton, OR and Franz Family Bakeries of Portland, OR. The hot dog was made as the central part of a media event surrounding the 100th anniversary of Franz Family Bakeries.
- On August 4, 2006, a hot dog measuring 60 metres (197 ft) in a bun measuring 60.3 metres (198 ft) was made by the Shizuoka Meat Producers of Shizuoka, Japan and the All-Japan Bread Association to obtain the world record. International media were on hand, and supporting documents have been verified by Guinness. The hot dog was made as the central part of a media event surrounding the 50th anniversary of the All-Japan Bread Association. The wiener was made offsite at the Shizuoka plant prior to the day, and it was then cooked along with the bread in a ballroom at the Akasaka Prince Hotel in Akasaka, Tokyo, Japan. After the official measurement, the hot dog was cut up and eaten by those present.
- On July 15, 2011, a hot dog measuring 203.8 metres (669 ft) and weighing approximately 120 kilograms (260 lb) was made by Ochsi to obtain the world record. The hot dog bun weighed approximately 150 kilograms (330 lb) and was made by Myriam Products. International media were on hand, and supporting documents have been verified by Johanna Hessling, of Guinness. The hot dog was made as the central part of a media event surrounding the 2011 Expo in Asuncion, Paraguay. After the official measurement, the hot dog was cut up and eaten by those present.

== Other attempts ==
On July 12th, 1960, the Hervitz Packing Co. in Harrisburg, Pennsylvania created a 65-foot long hot dog for the City's Centennial, but Guinness World Records wasn't present to certify it.

An attempt in October 2017 in the town of Flensburg in Germany, where a group manufactured and served a U-shaped hot dog with a length of 218.7 metres (718 ft), was considered invalid as it consisted of multiple pieces of bread and sausages instead of one of each.

In Chile, the city of Talca made an unofficial attempt where they tried the longest completo, a Chilean upgraded version of the hot dog, where they reached over 450 metres by placing 2400 completos in a row.

== Technical challenges ==
Creating a long hot dog is not much of a feat. This is because the hot dog is structurally quite sound, and remarkably flexible. In the August 2006 record breaking attempt, the hot dog was manufactured by Shizuoka Meat Producers, and was wound into a large plastic barrel which was easily transported inside a delivery van.

The limiting factor for breaking this type of record is the bun. The bun, in order to remain in one continuous unit, needs to be baked in its final form. For the All-Japan Bread Association, this meant the connection of the longest conveyor belt possible with the equipment available to them. The dough was assembled in half-meter sections, then pressed together to create a longer tube of dough, which was then fed through the ovens via conveyor, and carried away from the ovens by another conveyor. The key was to make sure that the already-cooked bun did not move at a faster rate than the bun behind it because this would cause the bun to pull apart. The wiener was fed through the oven at the same time to cook it. There also needed to be space outside the oven to store the bun and wiener until the entire bun had been baked. To allow for enough room for this to happen, the ovens and prep area were set up outside the ballroom of the Akasaka Prince Hotel on the loading dock, and the bun and wiener were fed into the ballroom along the conveyor as they exited the oven.

Upon completion, the bun was sliced down the middle by bakers, and spectators were asked to don rubber gloves and first lift the wiener in one piece for photos, and then insert it into the bun. After being topped with mustard and ketchup, the completed hot dog was lifted by the assembled spectators 30 centimetres (12 in) off the conveyor for photos. Finally, the official measurement was completed, and the wiener was 60 metres (197 ft) in length, with the bun coming in at 60.3 metres (198 ft) in length. After photos and video of the official measurement were completed, the hot dog was cut into sections and the assembled spectators each had a piece. However, this only used about 8 metres (26 ft) of the hot dog.
