= Cuisine of New Jersey =

Cuisine of the State of New Jersey

Campbell's is headquartered in Camden

The cuisine of New Jersey is derived from the state's long immigrant history and its close proximity to both New York City and Philadelphia. Due to its geographical location, New Jersey can generally be divided by New York City cuisine in the northern and central parts of the state and Philadelphia cuisine in the southern parts. Restaurants in the state often make use of locally grown ingredients such as asparagus, blueberries, cranberries, tomatoes, corn, and peaches. New Jersey is particularly known for its diners, of which there are approximately 525, the most of any state. Various foods invented in the state, such as the pork roll, and salt water taffy, remain popular there today.

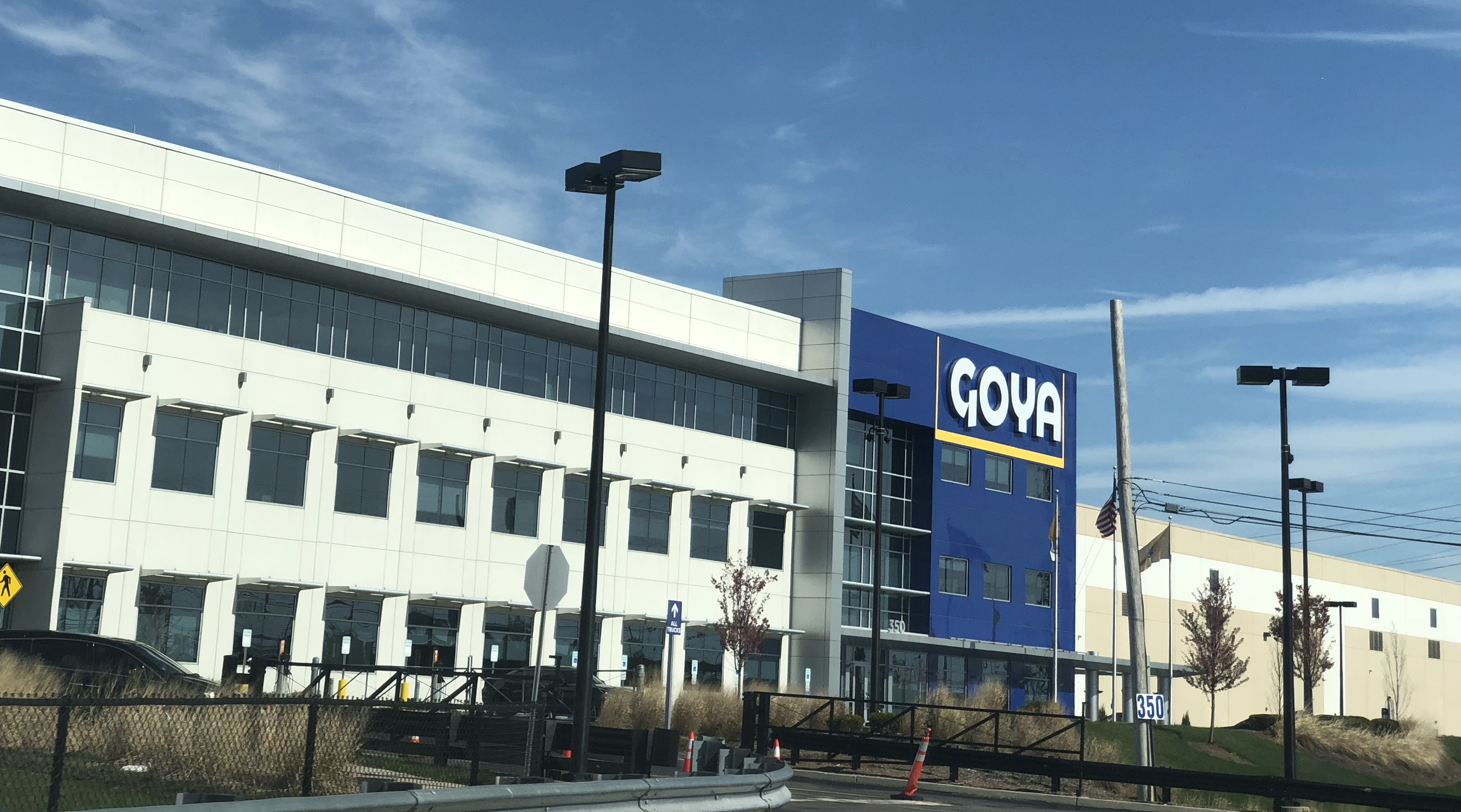
Goya Foods is headquartered in Jersey City, New Jersey

The state is known for its commercial food and industrial production, beginning with the founding of Campbell's, headquartered in Camden since 1869. Goya Foods, the largest Hispanic-owned food company in the United States, operates a state-of-the-art, sustainable corporate headquarters in Jersey City. M&M's candy has been produced in Hackettstown, New Jersey since 1958. Manischewitz, one of the top producers of Jewish food such as matzo and kosher wine, is headquartered in Newark, New Jersey.

Food writer, influencer, and chef Anthony Bourdain was raised in Leonia, New Jersey. He often profiled New Jersey restaurants on his multiple television shows. Carlo's Bake Shop in Hoboken is the setting for TLC's reality television series, Cake Boss. New Jersey is also well known for having convenience food stores, such as Wawa and QuickChek, along with submarine sandwich restaurants, like Jersey Mike's Subs.

== Agriculture ==
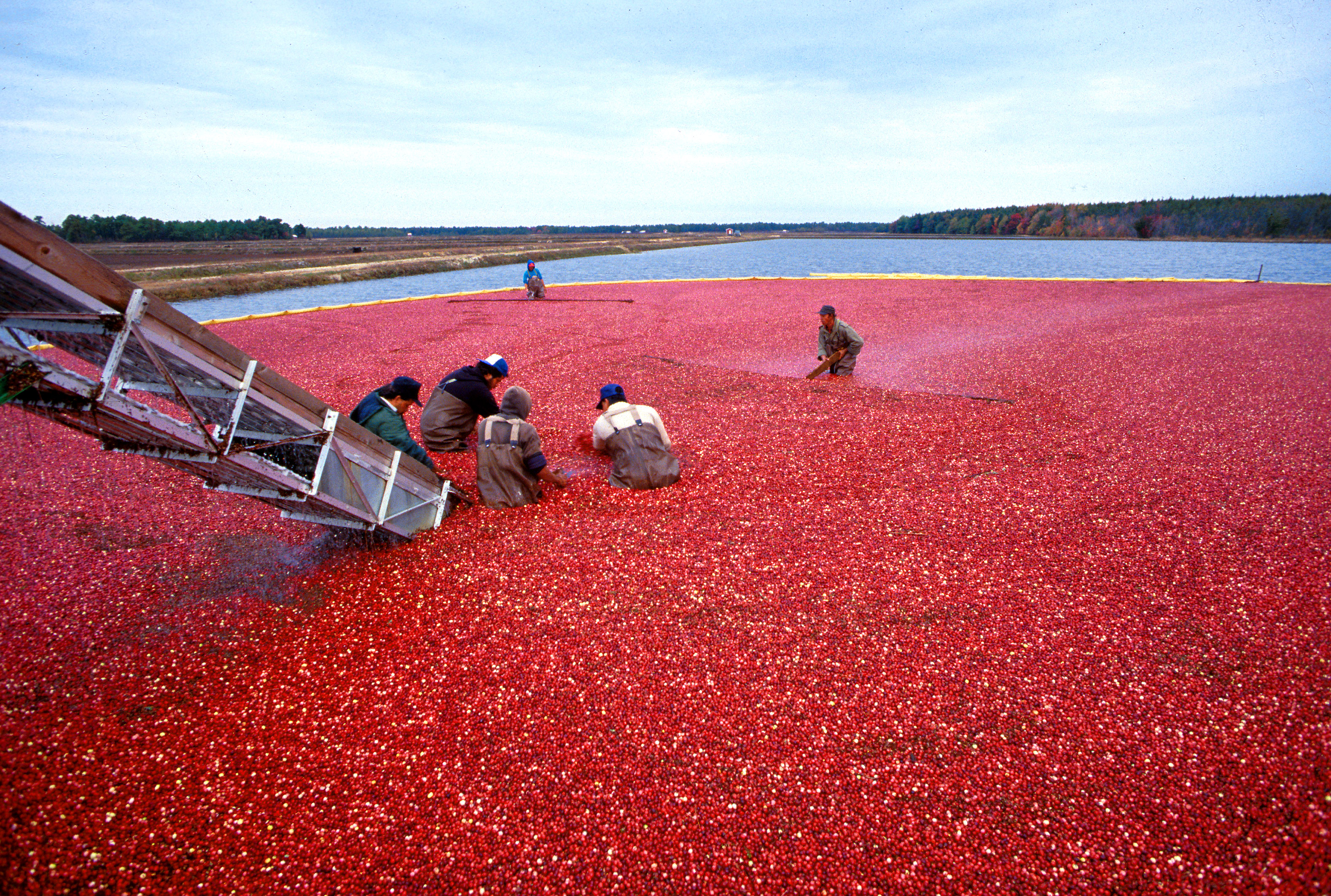
Cranberry harvest in New Jersey

Food and agriculture are New Jersey's third largest industry, behind pharmaceuticals and tourism, bringing in millions. New Jersey also has 733,450 acres of farmland. New Jersey is one of the top 10 producers of blueberries, cranberries, peaches, tomatoes, bell peppers, eggplant, cucumbers, apples, spinach, squash, and asparagus in the United States. Many restaurants in the state get locally grown ingredients because of this.

== Regional foods ==
Due to its position between New York City and Philadelphia, the signature foods of both cities are very popular in their corresponding suburbs. In the New York Metropolitan Area regions of North and Central Jersey, pizza, bagels, pastrami, and submarine sandwiches (often called "subs", sometimes called heroes) are popular. In the Philadelphia metropolitan area towns of South Jersey, hoagies (the Philadelphia term for the aforementioned submarine sandwich), cheesesteaks, soft pretzels, water ices, and scrapple are common. Several of these regional dishes have achieved popularity statewide.

=== North Jersey ===
There are a number of foods which are especially prominent in or unique to the Garden State. As with New York City, North Jersey is renowned as a hot dog stronghold, with several variants that have their roots in its cities. The ripper is perhaps the most famous type of hot dog native to New Jersey. It is deep-fried in oil until the casing bursts, or "rips", and might be best exemplified at Rutt's Hut, a longtime hot dog eatery in Clifton, New Jersey. Texas wieners are another type of hot dog that originated in the state. They are either grilled or deep-fried and served with spicy brown mustard, chopped onions, and a thin meat sauce similar to chili. Wieners ordered "all the way" are dressed with all three condiments.

Another type of hot dog indigenous to North Jersey is the Italian hot dog, which originated at Jimmy Buff's in Newark in 1932 and is one of the foods most synonymous with North Jersey's Italian-American culture, especially in Essex County. The Italian hot dog is prepared by slicing a roll of round pizza bread in half (for a double order) or into quarters (for a single order), digging a pocket into it, and then spreading mustard along the inside of the roll. A deep-fried dog (two for a double order) is stuffed into the pocket, topped by fried or sauteed onions and peppers, and then followed by deep-fried potatoes that have been thinly sliced into discs or thickly-cut into chunks and drizzled with ketchup. Italian sausages can be substituted for hot dogs and, as with their counterpart, are ordered as a single or double order.

Bagels are also a prominent part of New Jersey's cuisine. They are made New York style. Stores that make bagels daily are quite plentiful in the state. One bagel store, Teaneck Road Hot Bagels in Teaneck, was listed as a top 50 bagel shop in the United States.

=== Central Jersey ===
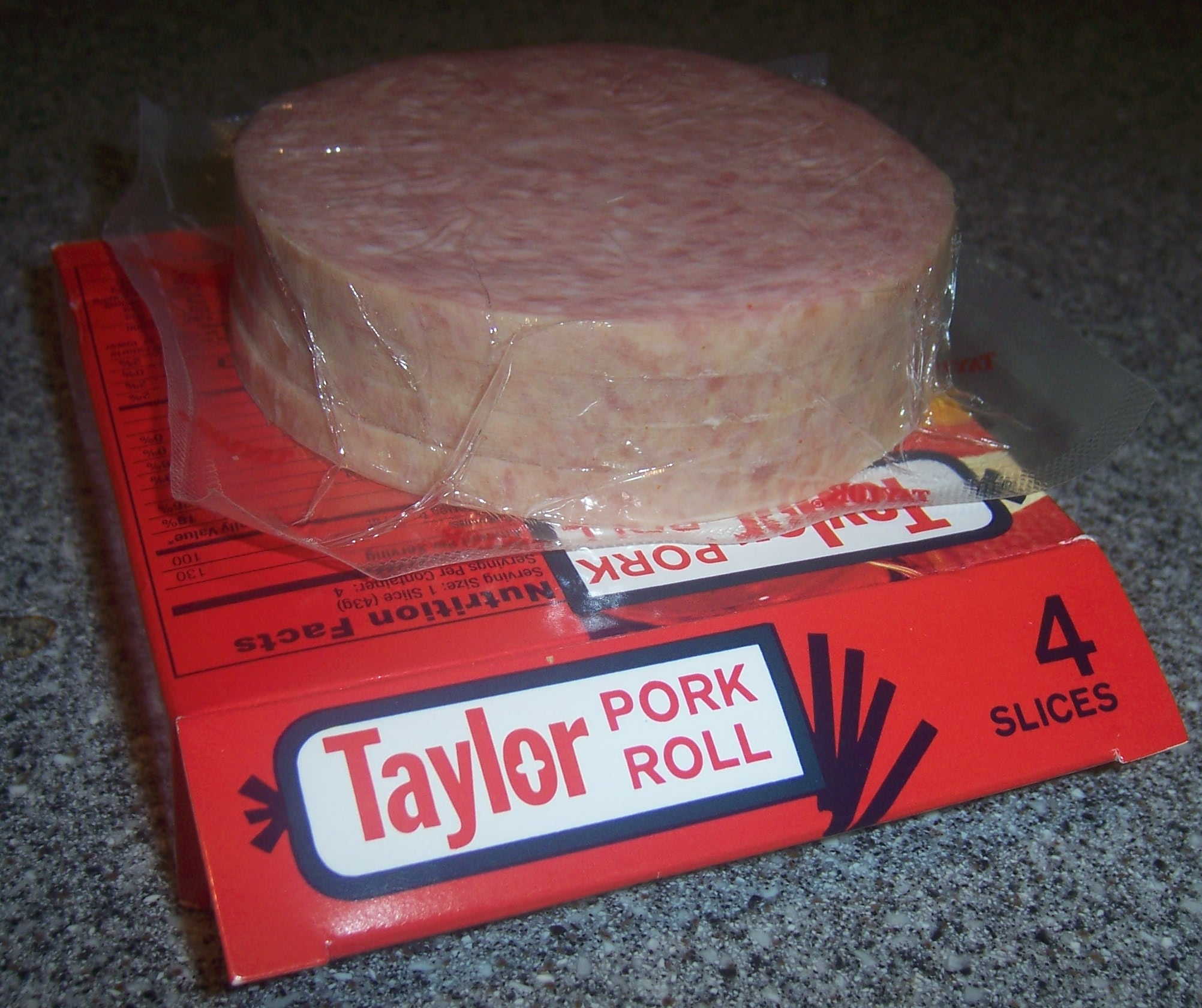
Taylor Pork Roll of Trenton.

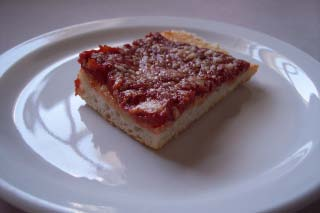
Tomato pie, found in Trenton; also a popular Philadelphia dish.

The state capital of Trenton, located near the boundary of Central and South Jersey, is known for two foods in particular: tomato pie and pork roll (also referred to as Taylor Ham). In Trenton, tomato pie is basically an interchangeable term for pizza, albeit with a subtle difference: While traditional pizzas are prepared by placing the cheese and toppings on top of the sauce and dough, tomato pies are made by laying the cheese directly on top of the dough, then adding the toppings, and finally spreading the sauce atop the mix. This creates a more tomato-intensive taste for the thin-crust pie.

Pork roll is a sausage-like pork product developed by John Taylor in Trenton in the late 19th century, and has become a popular breakfast and sandwich meat throughout the Garden State. In South Jersey and elsewhere, it is often referred to as a pork roll due to the tube-like sack, or "roll", in which it is traditionally packaged, while in North Jersey it is usually called Taylor Ham. The meat is generally eaten sliced and grilled like Canadian bacon, but is also known to be fried. Also common is the pork roll, egg and cheese sandwich, in which the pork roll is cooked on a griddle and then topped with a fried egg and American cheese and eaten on a hard roll.

The Grease Trucks of Rutgers University in New Brunswick, New Jersey have popularized "fat sandwiches", which are sandwiches usually consisting of various combinations of chicken fingers, french fries, mozzarella sticks, onion rings, and other fried foods. The Grease Trucks have been made famous by mentions in USA Today and Maxim Magazine, among other media outlets.

=== South Jersey ===
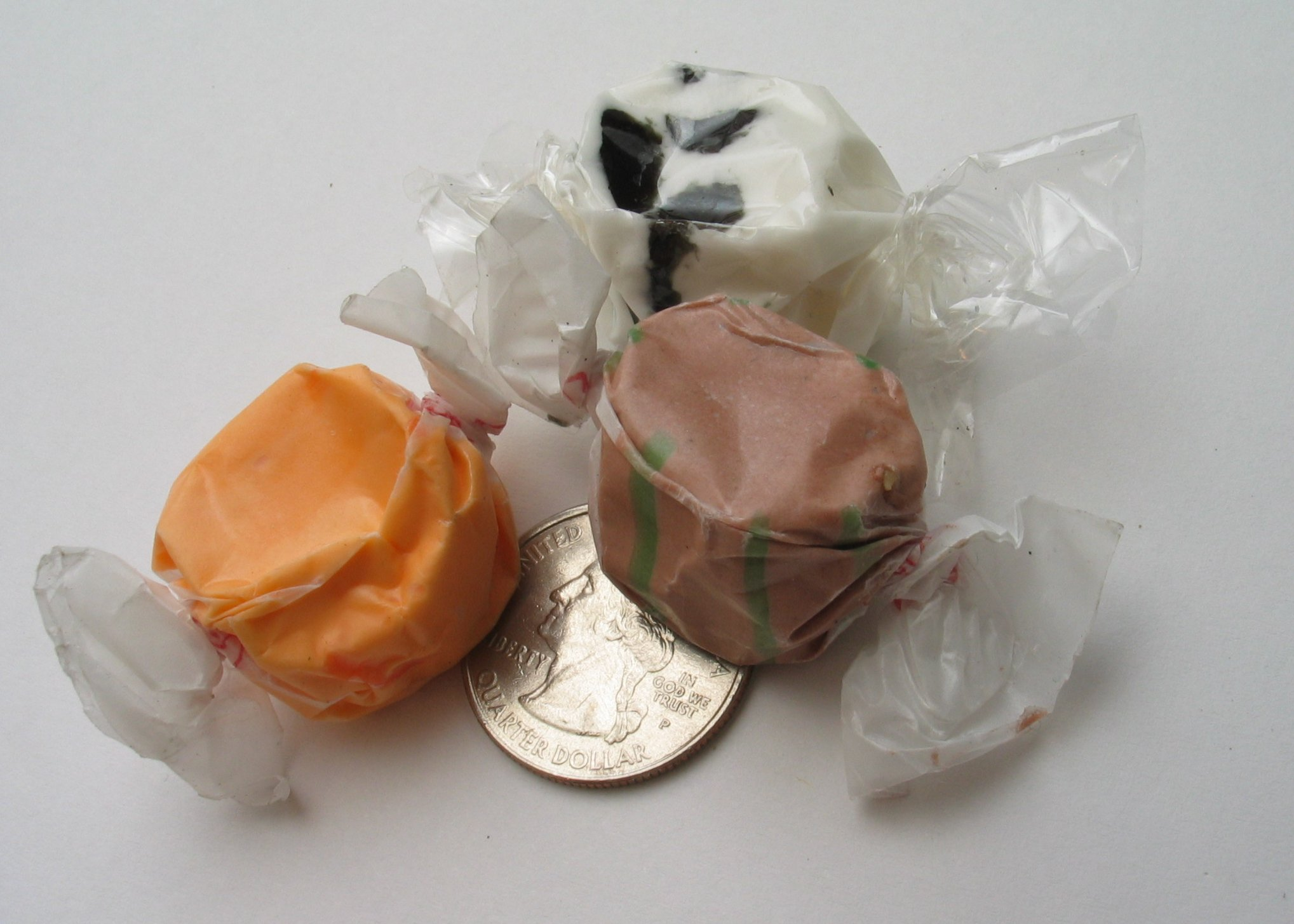
Salt water taffy, a staple of the Atlantic City area of the Jersey Shore since in the 1880s.

Salt water taffy is a soft taffy originally produced and marketed in the Jersey Shore resort town of Atlantic City beginning in the late 19th century, and is a staple candy and souvenir item of boardwalks in the state. It is widely sold throughout beachfront areas of the East Coast of the United States and Canada.

New Jersey Cheesesteaks, or Donkey's Steaks, are a variation of the Philly Cheesesteak sandwich that is found primarily in Camden County and the surrounding areas. Differentiated by the use of a poppy-seeded Kaiser roll, and often accompanied with a hot cherry pepper relish, this style originates in Camden, New Jersey at Donkey's Place, a local standby that was founded in 1943. In recent years, Donkey's has expanded to additional locations in Medford and Mt. Holly.

The regional soft drink Boost! is sold primarily in Burlington County, but can also be found in other places from Trenton to Woodbury and as far east as Williamstown.

== Diners ==
New Jersey is renowned for its multitude of diners, which number over 500, more than any other state. Many are open 24 hours a day. A large number of diners are owned or were founded by Greeks and offer Greek dishes like gyros in addition to standard diner fare. Typical cuisine includes staple American foods such as hamburgers, club sandwiches, meatloaf, and other simple fare. There is often an emphasis on breakfast foods such as eggs (including omelettes), waffles, pancakes, and French toast, and most diners serve breakfast all day. Many diners in the state carry a full drink menu, including mixed drinks. Many also serve hand-blended milkshakes. The food is usually quite inexpensive, with a decent meal (sandwich, side dish, drink) often available for less than ten dollars. Many establishments have transparent display cases in or behind the counter for desserts, typically including a variety of pies and cheesecakes.

Specialties specific to New Jersey diners include the previously mentioned pork roll, egg, and cheese sandwich, as well as disco fries, a food similar to the Quebec dish of poutine. They consist of french fries, usually slightly overcooked, and covered with brown gravy and melted mozzarella cheese.

== Dishes ==
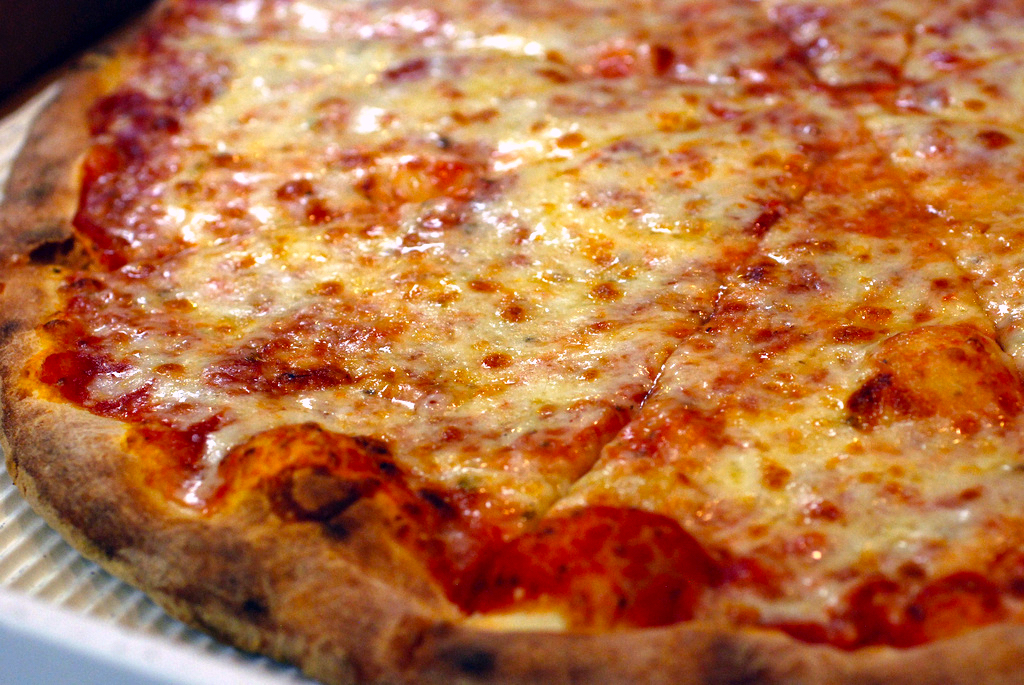
Foods such as New York-style pizza (above) and the Philadelphia cheesesteak (below) are associated with New Jersey due to its position between both cities.

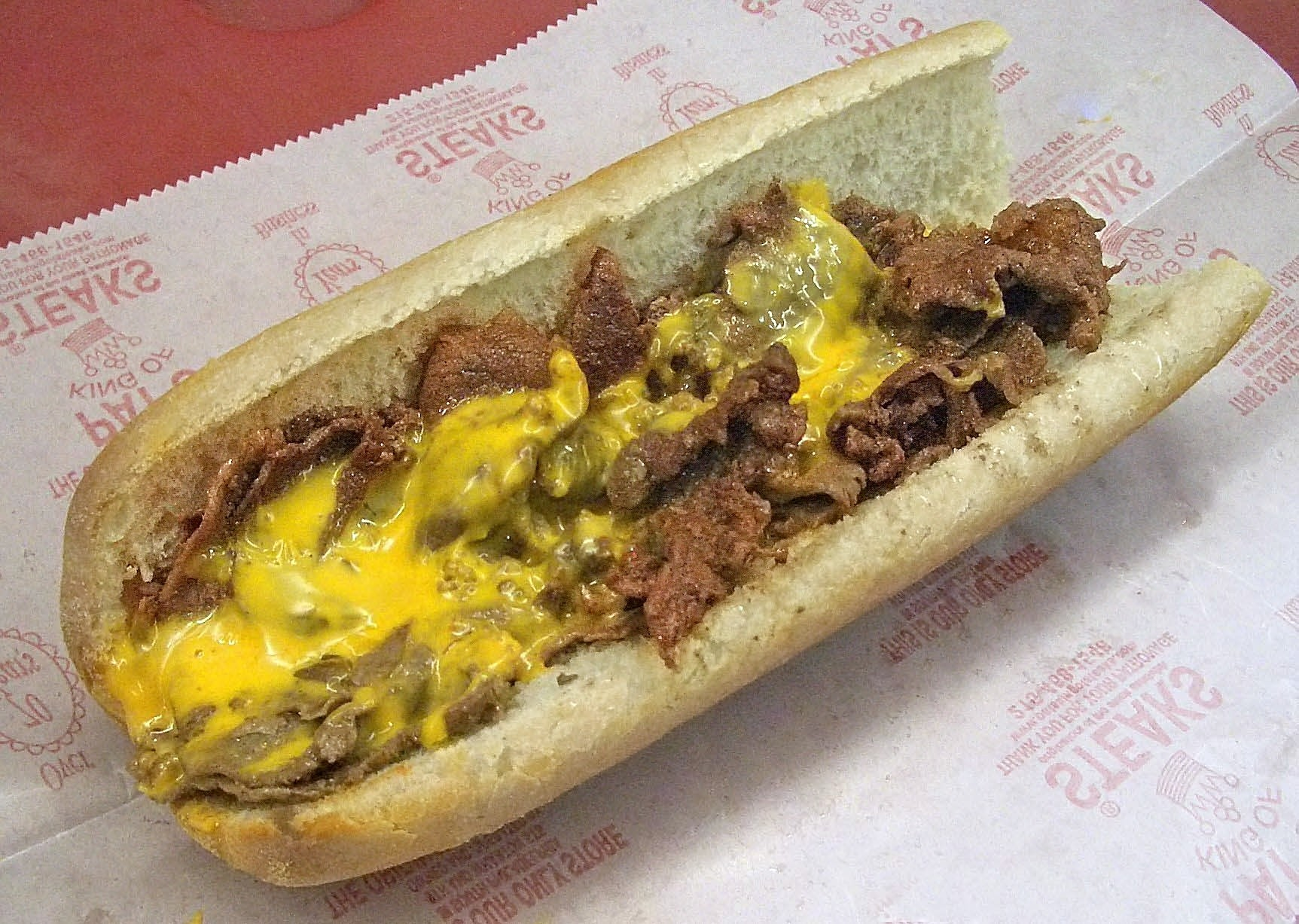
- Disco fries – French fries covered with brown gravy and melted cheese, usually mozzarella.
- Rippers – hot dogs that have been deep-fried until they rip apart (see Danger dog)
- Texas Wiener – deep-fried hot dog served with onions and chili sauce.
- Italian hot dog
- Pork roll or Taylor Ham – usually fried and eaten on a sandwich with eggs and/or cheese.
- Roll and butter – hard or kaiser roll with butter. Some establishments offer salad dressing in addition to butter.
- Sloppy joe – sandwich native to North-Central Jersey – A triple decker deli sandwich (most commonly containing corned beef or pastrami, turkey and ham, but with many variations) dressed with cole slaw and Russian dressing on thin-sliced rye bread. In other parts of the state, this is known as a "Reuben," and this area views a sloppy joe using the more common definition of a hot sandwich of pan-cooked hamburger meat soaked in a sweet, tangy sauce with small pieces of diced bell peppers, usually served on a hamburger roll or Kaiser roll.
- Jersey breakfast dog – danger dog (deep-fried bacon-wrapped hot dog) with eggs and melted cheese.
- In and Outers – hot dogs that have been deep-fried until they blister slightly (see Danger dog)
- Salt water taffy
- New York-style pizza
- Tomato pie
- Bagel
- Sausage sandwich
- Beefsteak (banquet)
- Panzerotti – mozzarella and tomato sauce filled deep fried dough pocket similar to but larger than an empanada

== Ethnic cuisine and enclaves ==
In addition to its local foods, New Jersey boasts a plethora of ethnic cuisines due to its large immigrant population. Some of the more prominent examples include Chinese, Indian, Brazilian, Taiwanese, Korean, Portuguese, Spanish, Middle Eastern, Italian, Polish, and Greek food. Cuban cuisine has also had an impact in New Jersey, especially in the Hudson County area. Typical Cuban food found in the state includes Christianos y Moros (also known as arroz Moros), lechon, the Cuban sandwich, arroz salteado and dulce de leche.

Among the ethnic culinary enclaves in New Jersey

- Middle Eastern: Main Street and Crooks Avenue, South Paterson, aka Little Istanbul or Little Ramallah
- Latino: Bergenline, North Hudson (aka Havana on the Hudson) and Little Lima
- Portuguese/Brazilian: Ironbound, Newark
- Indian: Oak Tree Road, Iselin and Edison; India Square; Jersey City
- Japanese: Fort Lee and Edgewater
- Korean: Koreatown, Palisades Park, Fort Lee, and Northern Valley
- Hungarian: Fifth Ward, New Brunswick

== See also ==
- Cuisine of New York City
- Cuisine of Philadelphia

== Bibliography ==
- Genovese, Peter (1996). Jersey Diners. Rutgers University Press. ISBN 978-0-8135-2350-7.
- Di Ionno, Mark (2002). Backroads, New Jersey: Driving at the Speed of Life. Rutgers University Press. ISBN 0-8135-3133-0.
- Caparulo, Vicki J. (2003). Great Dishes from New Jersey's Favorite Restaurants. Rutgers University Press. ISBN 0-8135-3311-2.
- Genovese, Peter (2007). New Jersey Curiosities, 2nd: Quirky Characters, Roadside Oddities & Other Offbeat Stuff. Globe Pequot. ISBN 978-0-7627-4112-0.
