= Cheese dog =

Hot dog with cheese filling

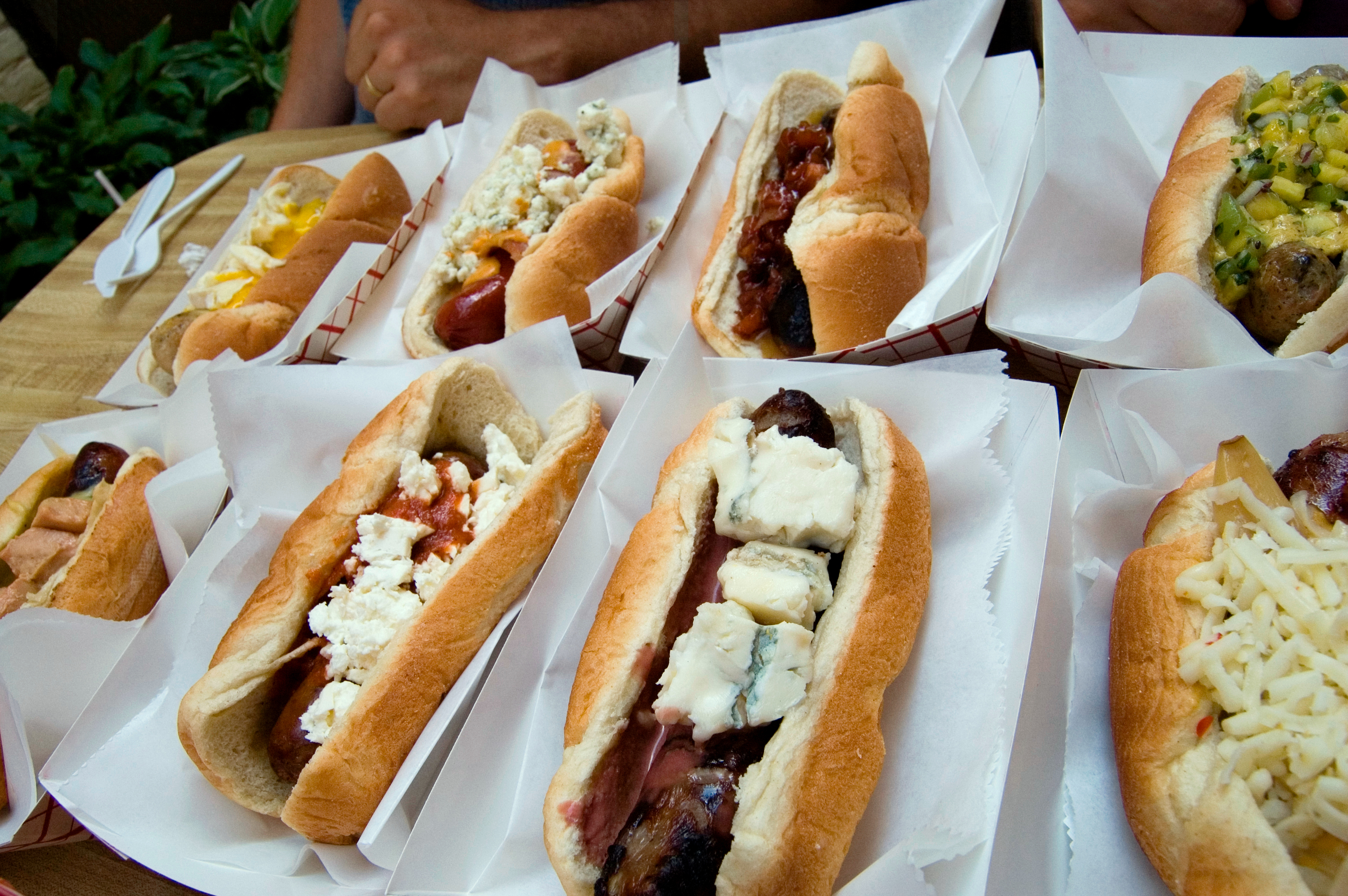
- A selection of several cheese dogs
- Place of origin: United States
- Main ingredients: Hot dog, cheese or processed cheese
- Variations: Coney dog, Francheezie, Macaroni and cheese dog, Reuben dog, Seattle-style hot dog, Swiss-style cheese dogs

A cheese dog is a hot dog served with cheese or processed cheese on it, or stuffed within it as a filling.

== Cheese types ==
In the United States, sliced or grated cheese, such as cheddar or American cheese, is commonly used, often served melted on the hot dogs. The use of other types of cheese also occurs, such as cream cheese and Swiss cheese. The cheese may be on the bun, on the wiener, processed inside the hot dog, or placed in the middle of a hot dog that has been sliced in half.

== Bread types ==
Traditional hot dog buns are typically used. Slices of toast are also used sometimes, or just plain bread.

== Variations ==
=== Coney dog ===
Cheeses are also often served on chili dogs or Coney Island hot dogs. An example includes the Cincinnati Cheese Coney which uses shredded cheddar cheese.

=== Francheezie ===
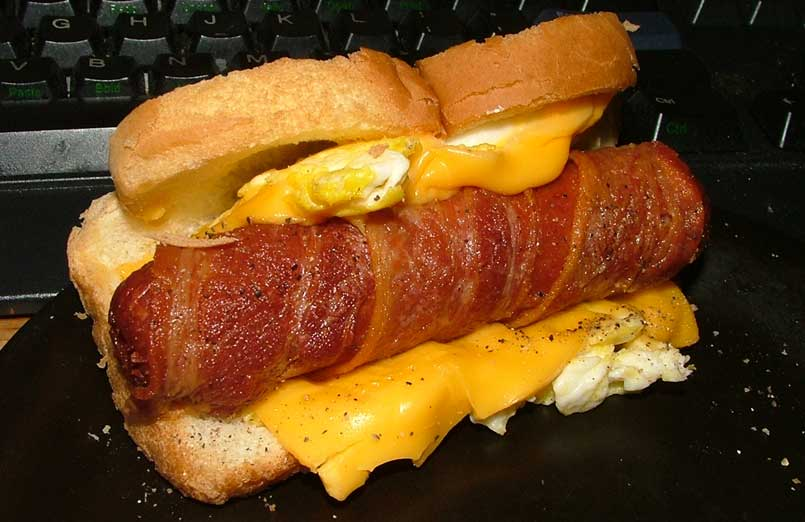
A danger dog with cheese

In Chicago there is a variation of the danger dog called the Francheezie. Typically found at "greasy spoon" restaurants, it consists of a jumbo hot dog split in the middle and filled with Cheddar cheese (or Velveeta). It is wrapped in bacon and deep-fried, then served on a toasted bun.

=== Macaroni and cheese dog ===
Another variation is a hot dog topped with macaroni and cheese.

=== Reuben dog ===
A reuben dog can consist of a hot dog topped with ingredient combinations such as corned beef, sauerkraut, Swiss cheese and Russian dressing.

=== Seattle dog ===
A Seattle-style hot dog, sometimes referred to as a "Seattle Dog," is a hot dog topped with cream cheese that has become popular in Seattle, Washington.

=== Swiss-style cheese dogs ===
A Swiss schnauzer is a regional variation consisting of a bratwurst served with Swiss cheese and sauerkraut. In San Diego, California, a Swiss-style hot dog called a "Swiener" is prepared with a hot dog and Raclette cheese stuffed inside of hollowed-out baguette bread.

=== Texas Tommy ===
A Texas Tommy is prepared with bacon and cheese.

== See also ==
- Finger food
- List of hot dogs
- List of cheese dishes
- List of sausage dishes
