= Texas toast =

Toast made from thick-sliced sandwich bread

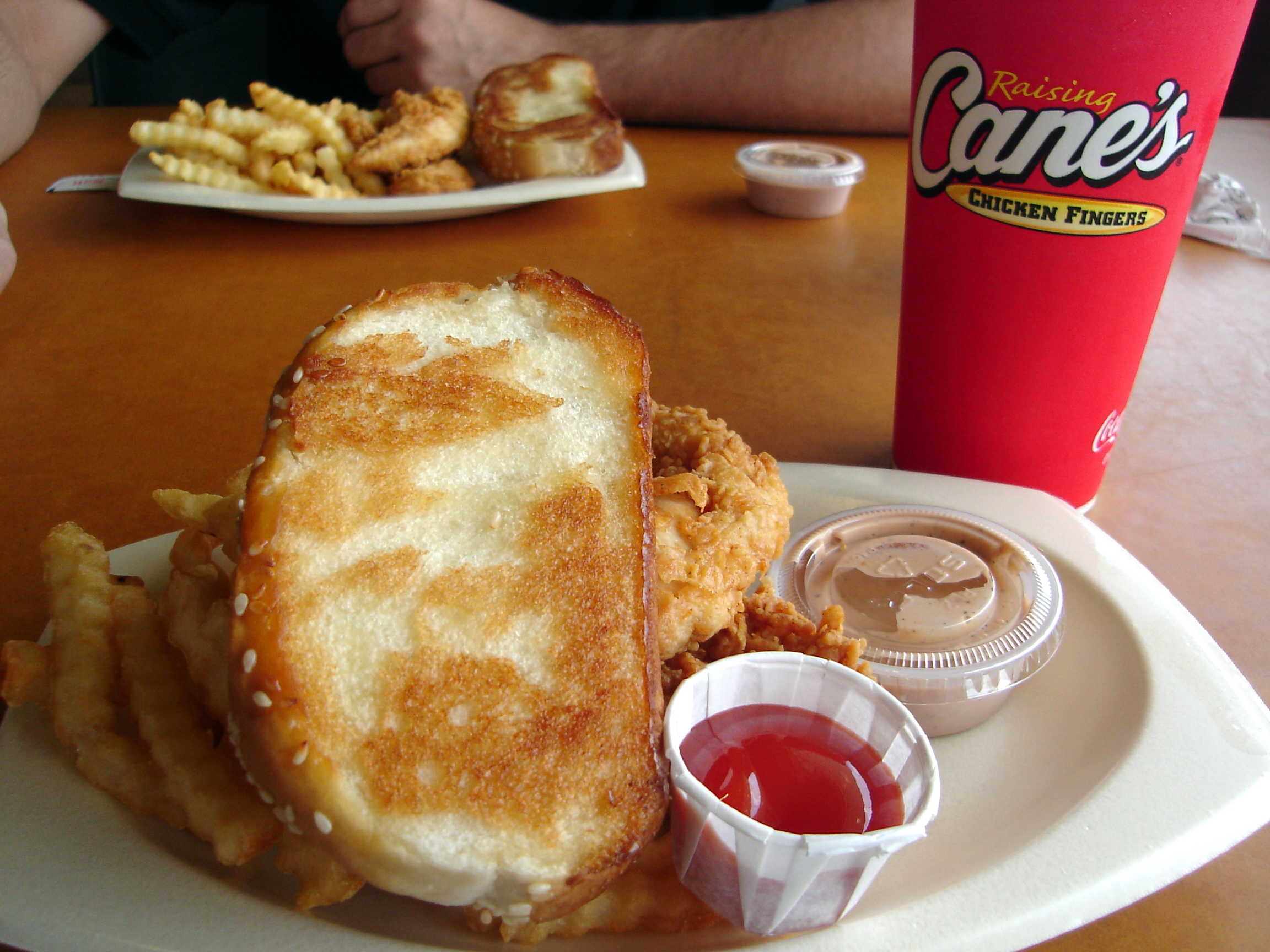
- A slice of Texas toast served at Raising Cane's Chicken Fingers
- Place of origin: United States
- Region or state: Texas

Texas toast is a toasted bread that is typically made from sliced bread that has been sliced at double the usual thickness of packaged bread. Texas toast is prepared by spreading butter on both sides of the bread and broiling or grilling it until it is a light golden brown. Commonly, garlic is added to the butter, yielding a form of garlic bread. The toast may include cheese on one or both sides, similar to an open-faced grilled cheese sandwich.

Popular not only in Texas and its bordering states, Texas toast is often served as a side dish with southern-style dishes, such as chicken-fried steak, fried catfish, or barbecue.

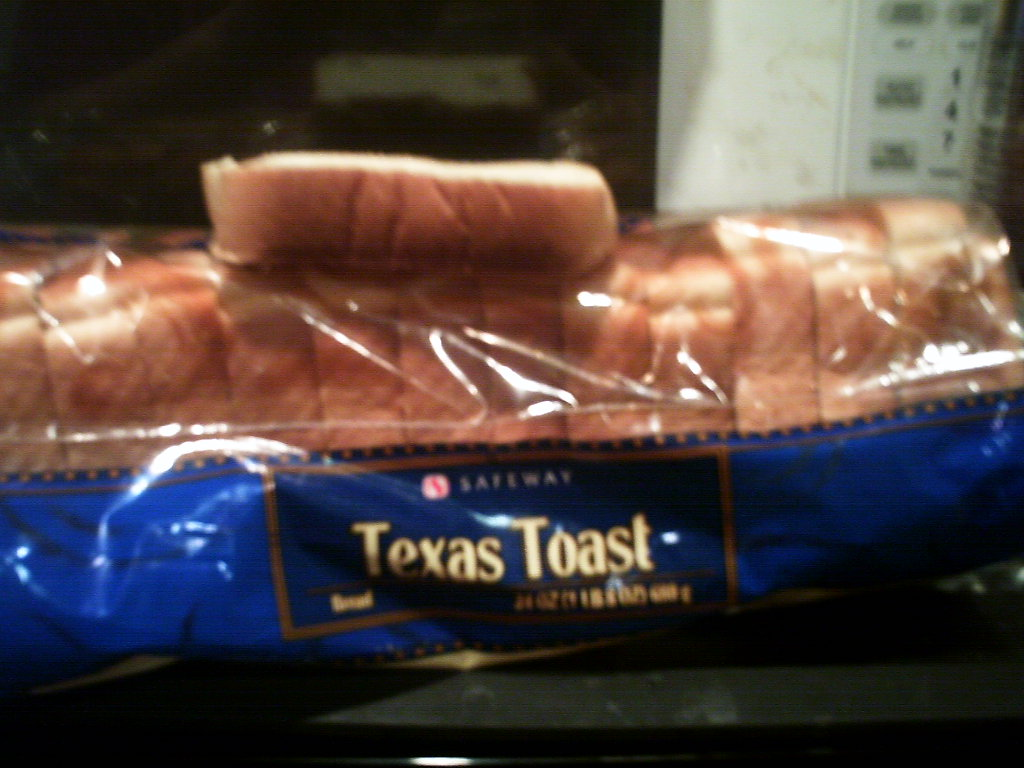
A loaf of thick-sliced white bread for making Texas toast, with a slice on top

Thick-sliced bread sold for making Texas toast can be used in the same manner as ordinary bread slices, such as in sandwiches, and it is especially useful for dishes involving liquids or where extra thickness could improve the product. While most varieties sold for Texas toast are white bread, whole wheat varieties also exist.

Frozen Texas toast brands are also popular, with best sellers including the New York Brand of the T. Marzetti Company, and Pepperidge Farm.

== History ==
One claimant to the invention of Texas toast is Kirby's Pig Stand. The once-thriving chain, whose heyday in the 1940s saw over 100 locations across the United States, also claims to be the originator of the onion ring. Texas toast may have been first created in 1946 at the Pig Stand in Denton, Texas, after a bakery order for thicker slices of bread resulted in slices too thick for the toaster; a cook, Wiley W. W. Cross, suggested buttering and grilling them as a solution. Another Pig Stand cook in Beaumont, Texas, claimed he created the idea of grilling the bread. W.W.W. Cross is also credited for combining the Texas toast with chicken-fried steak to create Kirby's Pig Stand's famous Chicken Fried Steak Sandwich.

== See also ==
- Texas Tommy (hot dog)
- Texas wiener
