= Texas Tommy (food) =

American hotdog dish with bacon and cheese

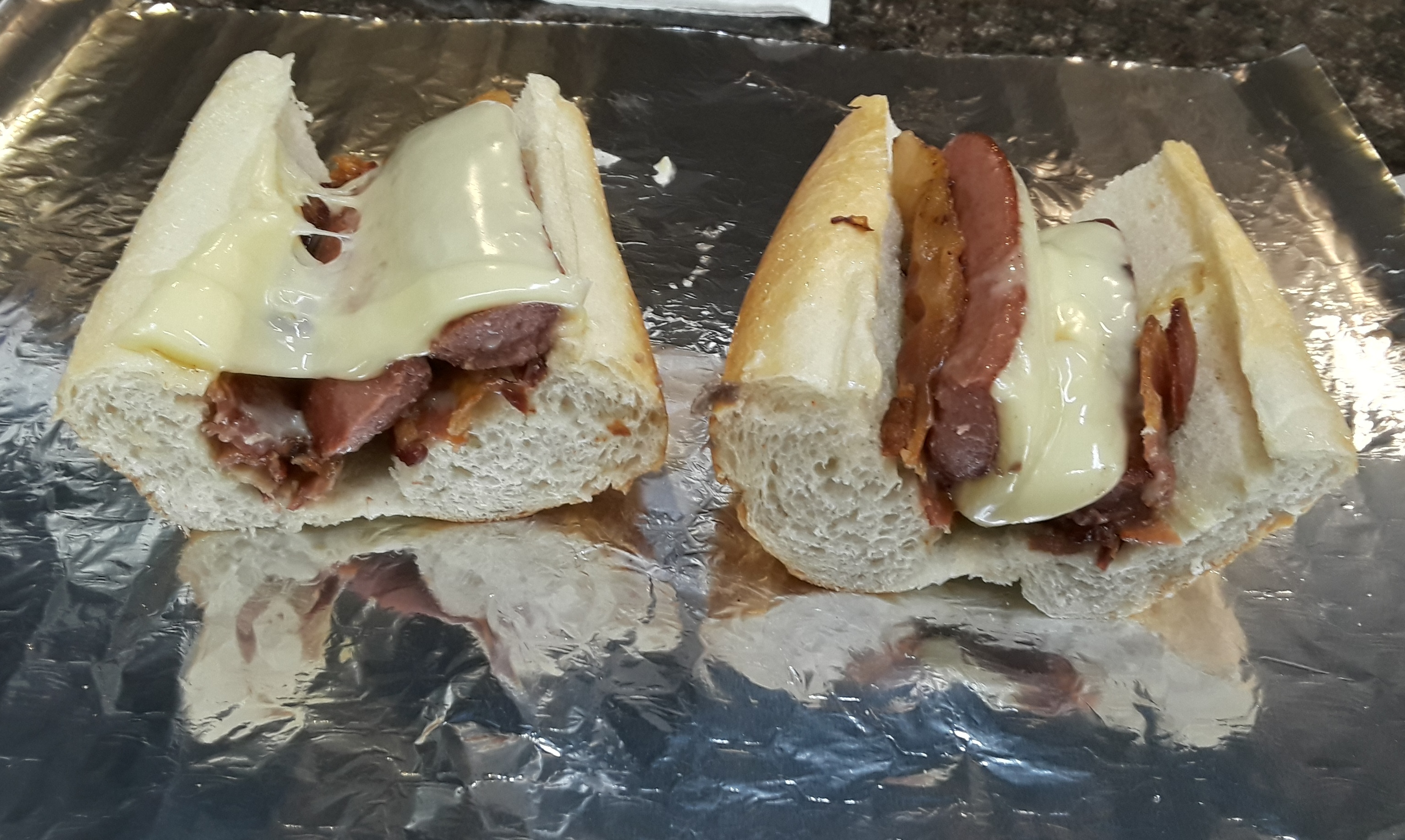
A Texas Tommy at Ishkabibble's in Philadelphia

The Texas Tommy is an American hot dog dish from Philadelphia and the Philadelphia metro area, consisting of a hot dog prepared with bacon and cheese. Despite the name, it was invented in the 1950s in Pottstown, Pennsylvania, a town right outside Philadelphia. It may be cooked by various methods, such as grilling and deep frying, and some variations exist. The Texas Tommy became a common dish in Philadelphia, the Philadelphia metropolitan area, and South Jersey, and it is a menu item at various restaurants and hot dog restaurants in the United States.

== History ==
The Texas Tommy was invented in Pottstown, Pennsylvania, in the 1950s and was a popular dish among 1950s housewives. The origin of the dish's name is unclear, and it has been suggested that its name may have been devised per the "general branding of hot dogs as 'Texan' on the East Coast."

== Preparation ==
The Texas Tommy is prepared by slicing a hot dog lengthwise to split it; cheese is placed within the slit; and the hot dog is then wrapped in bacon, secured with toothpicks, and cooked and served on a warmed or toasted bun. Cheddar or American cheese may be used, and some versions are prepared using Cheez Whiz. In the 1950s, Velveeta was sometimes used in their preparation. Some versions are prepared by topping a hot dog with bacon and cheese. It may be cooked by barbecuing, grilling, broiling or deep frying. Additional condiments may be used, such as mustard, ketchup and relish. Some versions may have a high cholesterol and fat content.

== Purveyance ==
The Texas Tommy is a common dish at diners and greasy spoons in Philadelphia, eastern Pennsylvania, and southern New Jersey. The dish's availability is widespread at restaurants in Philadelphia, and some cheesesteak restaurants in Philadelphia also offer the dish. Little Pete's restaurant, located in the Center City district of Philadelphia, was well known for serving the dish. The Texas Tommy has been served at baseball games at Citizens Bank Park in Philadelphia, and in 2012, the dish was listed on the Serious Eats list of The Craziest Major League Baseball Hot Dogs of 2012. The version served at Citizens Bank Park included the addition of chili. Additionally, some hot dog restaurants in other areas of the United States include the Texas Tommy on their menus.

== See also ==
- Cheese dog
- Cuisine of Philadelphia
- Danger dog
- Hot dog variations
- List of hot dogs
- Texas toast
- Texas wiener
