= Ripper (food) =

Type of hotdog

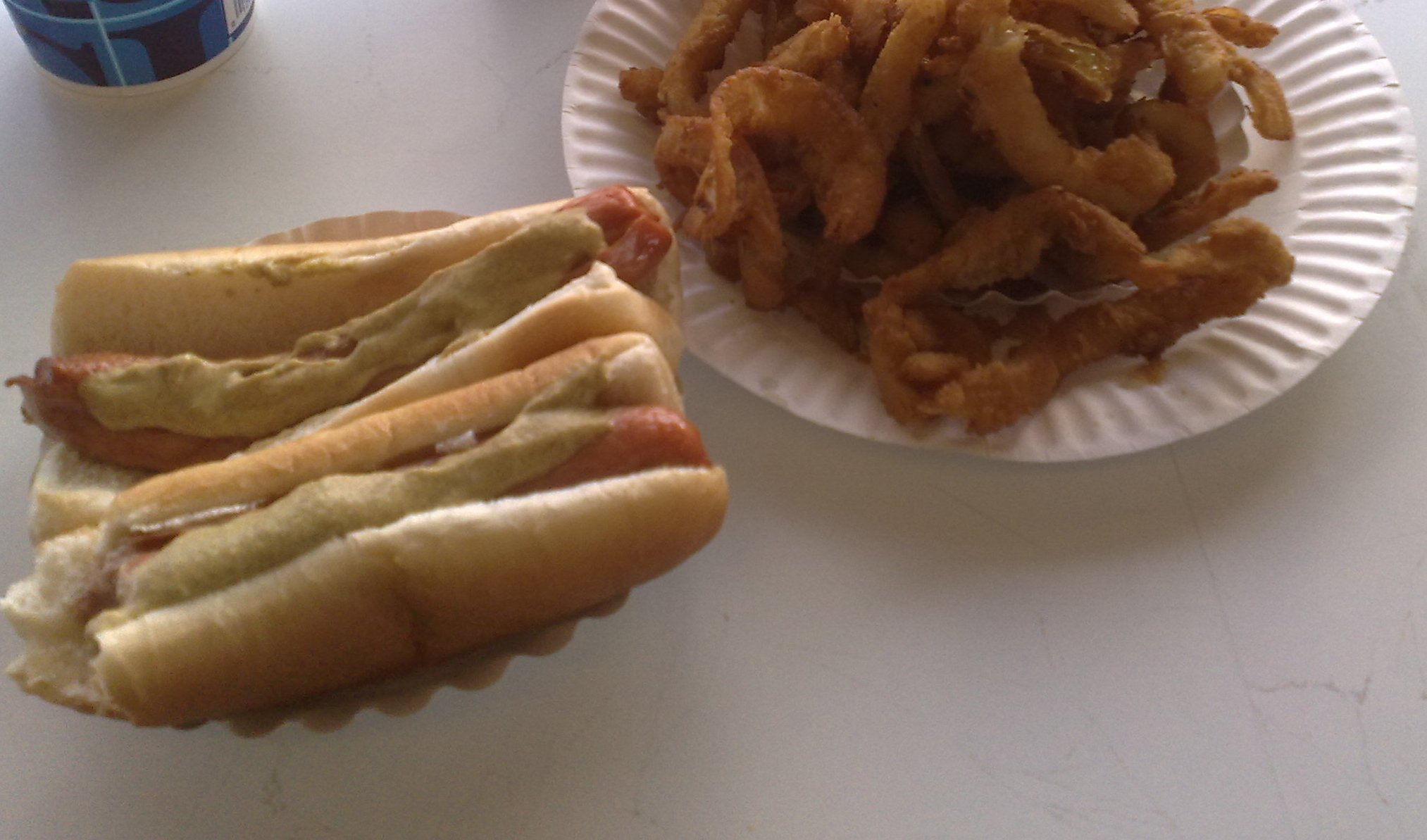
- Rippers with onion rings
- Type: Hot dog
- Place of origin: United States
- Region or state: New Jersey
- Main ingredients: Hot dog bun, hot dog

Ripper is the slang term for a type of hot dog. The name is derived from a hot dog which is deep fried in oil, which sometimes causes the casing to burst, or "rip".

"Rippers" were featured in the Travel Channel special "Deep Fried Paradise".

== See also ==
- List of hot dogs
- Rutt's Hut
