= Rutt's Hut =

Restaurant in Clifton, New Jersey, U.S.

Coordinates: 40.8270°N 74.1237°W

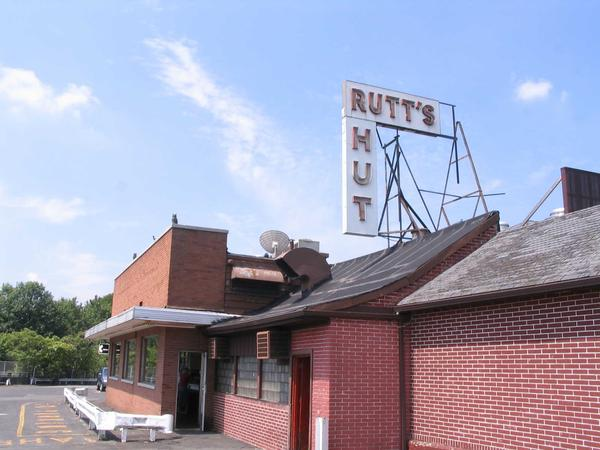
- Rutt's Hut
- Interactive map of Rutt's Hut

Restaurant information
- Established: 1928
- Owners: George Sakellaris, Gus Chrisafinis, George Petropoulakis, Nick Karagiorgis
- Dress code: Casual
- Location: 417 River Road, Clifton, New Jersey, 07014, United States
- Reservations: No
- Website: www.ruttshut.com

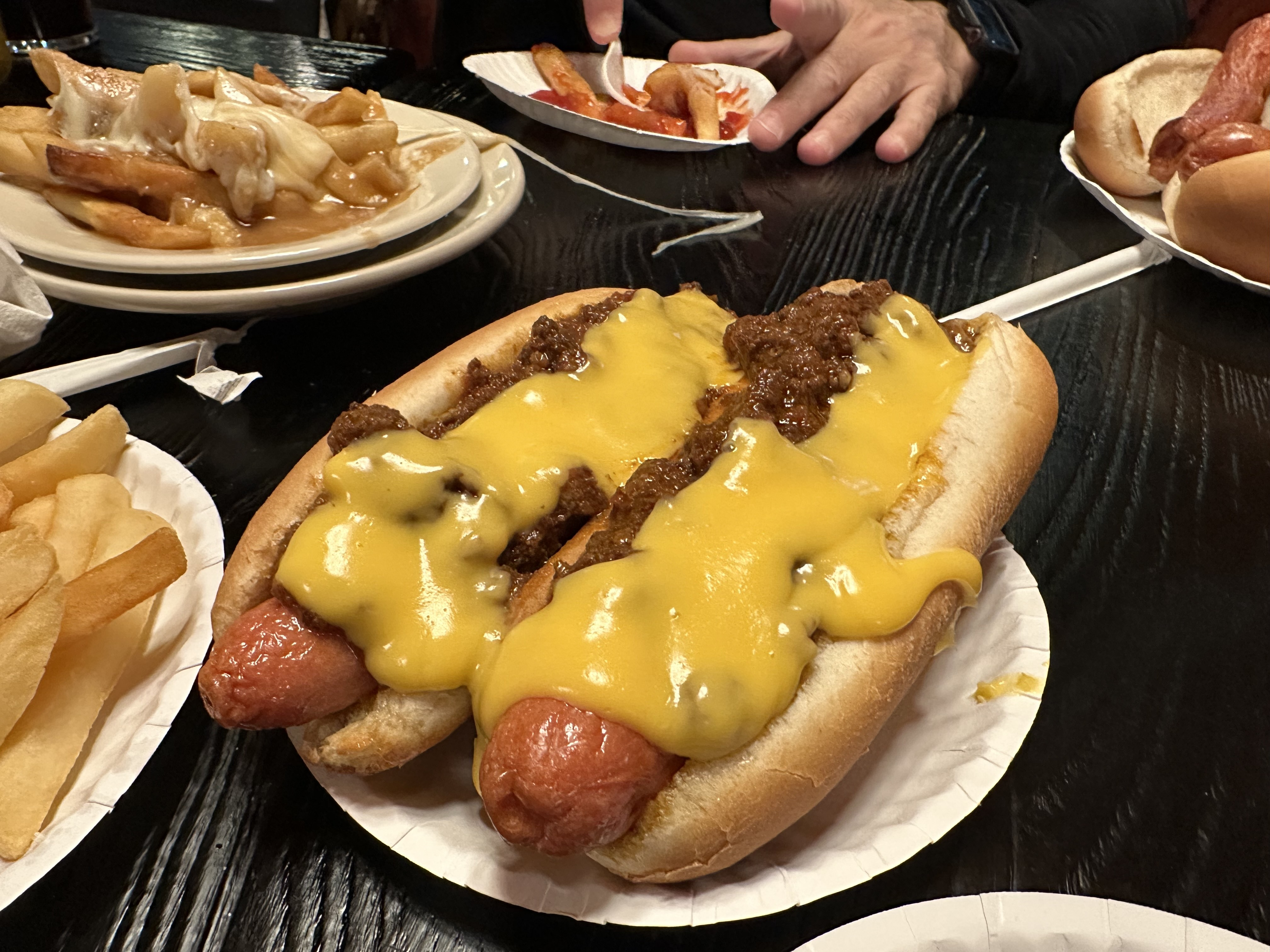
Two "rippers" at Rutt's Hutt with chili and melted cheese

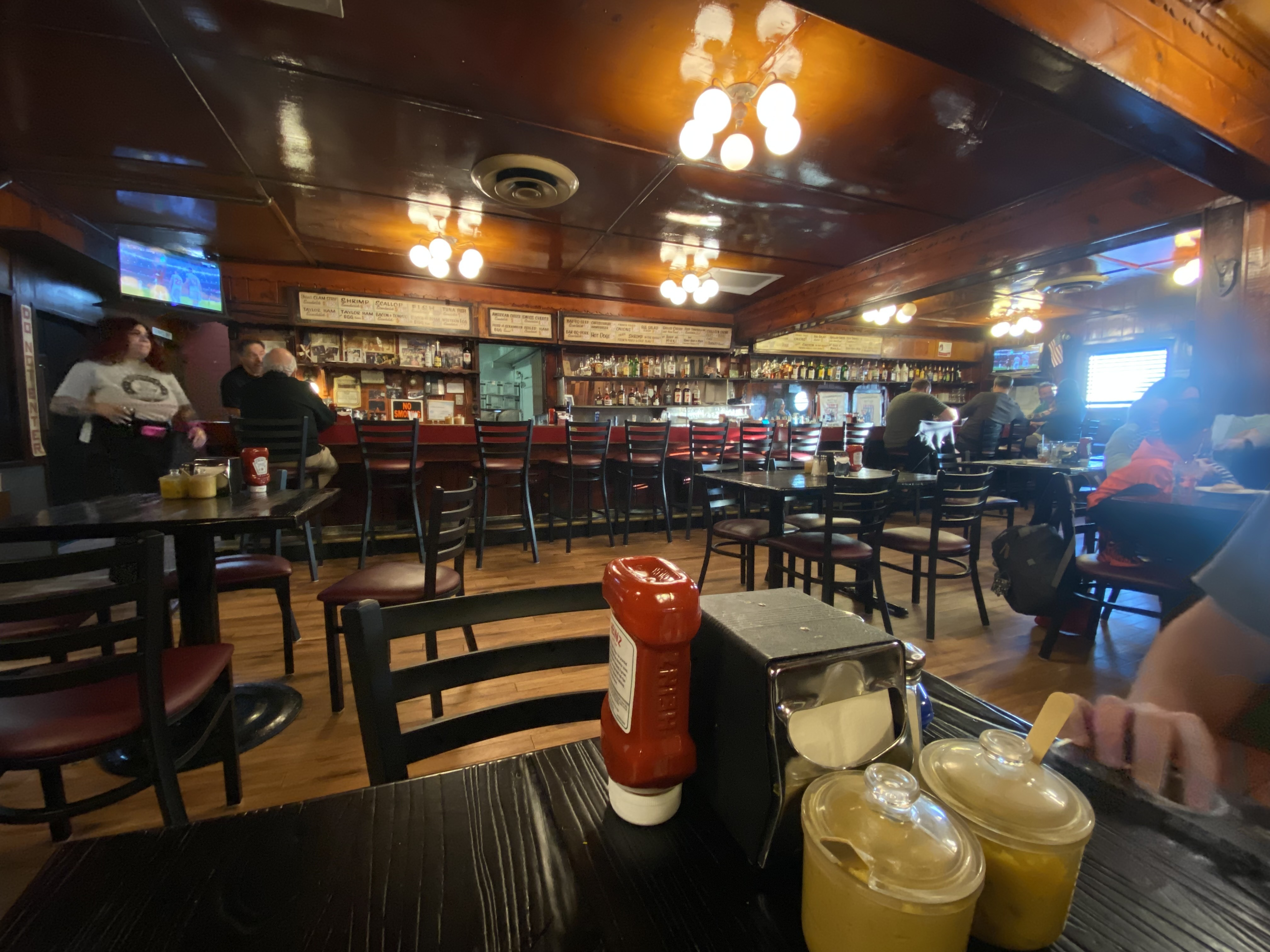
Inside of Rutt's Hut

Rutt's Hut is a restaurant in Clifton, New Jersey known for its Ripper, a deep-fried hot dog. Customers can also order the dogs 'In-And-Out' style which is only in the hot oil briefly, in addition to the ‘Weller’ where the sausage is “well-done”, and the 'Cremator' which is charred black. They are also well known for their proprietary relish, which, in addition to other ingredients, is a mix of pickle relish, mustard and cabbage, which gives it a light sauerkraut-like flavor.

The original roadside stand was opened in 1928 by Royal "Abe" Rutt and his wife, Anna. The family sold the restaurant to the current owners, George Petropoulakis, Louis Chrisafinis, Nicholas Karagiorgis, and George Sakellaris in late 1974. Today the building is split into two separate sections: a restaurant and bar, and a take-out counter.

The restaurant has been named the #1 Hot Dog in the Nation by The Daily Meal multiple times.
