= Danger dog =

Hot dog wrapped in bacon and deep-fried

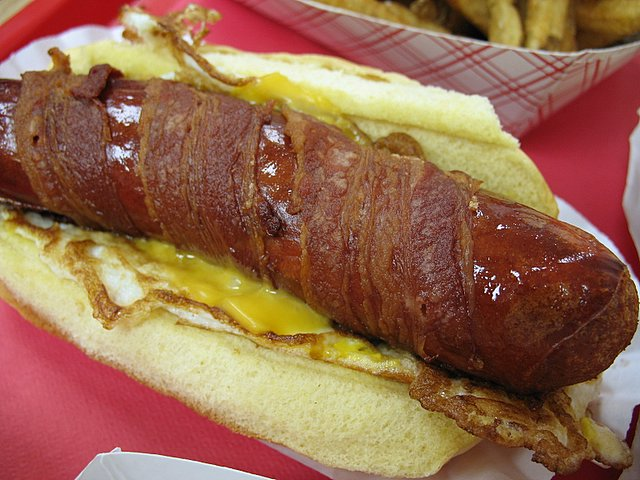
- A deep-fried, bacon-wrapped "Jersey breakfast dog"
- Alternative names: Bacon-wrapped hot dog Street dog Mission dog Sonoran hot dog
- Type: Hot dog
- Place of origin: Mexico
- Region or state: Tijuana or Hermosillo
- Main ingredients: Hot dog, bacon, hot dog bun, various toppings
- Variations: Jersey breakfast dog, francheezie

A danger dog is a hot dog that has been wrapped in bacon and deep-fried or grilled. It is served on a hot dog bun with various toppings. Also known as a bacon-wrapped hot dog, it was first sold by street vendors in Mexico. Its origin has been placed in either Tijuana or Hermosillo, as the Sonoran hot dog where it was originally served in a bolillo instead of a hot dog bun. These dogs are sold from carts that are ubiquitous along Avenida Revolución and the area surrounding the border in Tijuana, as well as the bar district in Ensenada, and are still popular in Southern Arizona.

Bacon-wrapped hot dogs were popularized in Los Angeles using available American-style hot dog buns, giving rise to the popular name L.A. Street Dog. The name "danger dog" comes from the perceived lack of food safety precautions taken by the street vendors who sell them, many of which are unlicensed and lack refrigeration.

While especially associated with Los Angeles, danger dogs are now sold by street vendors and in restaurants and sporting venues in urban areas around the United States such as San Diego, San Francisco, and New York City.

== Francheezie ==
In Chicago, there is a variation of the danger dog called the francheezie. This is an all-beef hot dog wrapped in bacon and deep-fried, with melted Cheddar or American cheese (or Velveeta). Usually the hot dog is split and filled with cheese before being deep-fried. Alternatively, the cheese may be added as a topping after frying. The francheezie is served on a bun. It is typically sold by restaurants rather than street vendors.

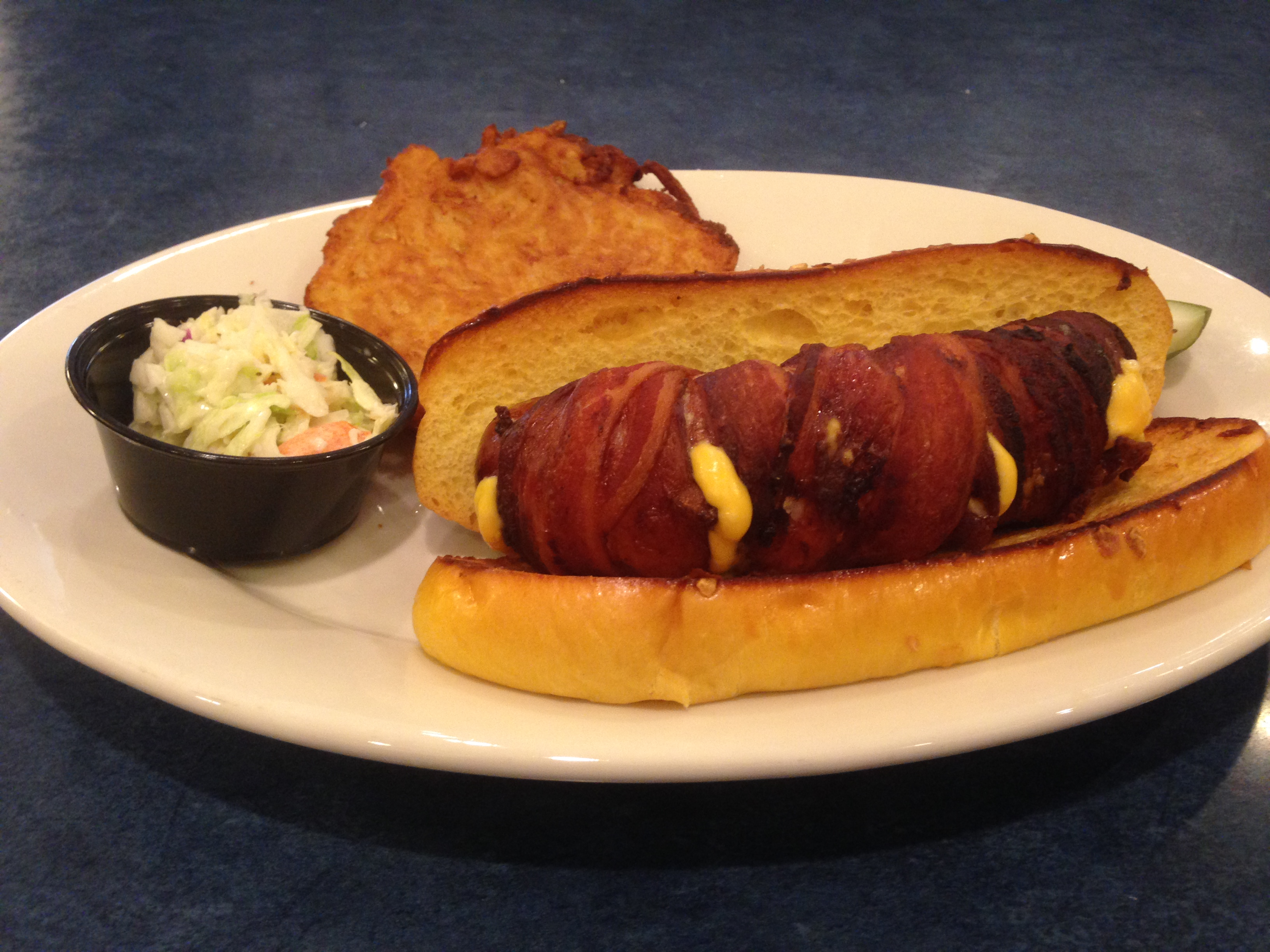
A francheezie, with cole slaw and a potato pancake

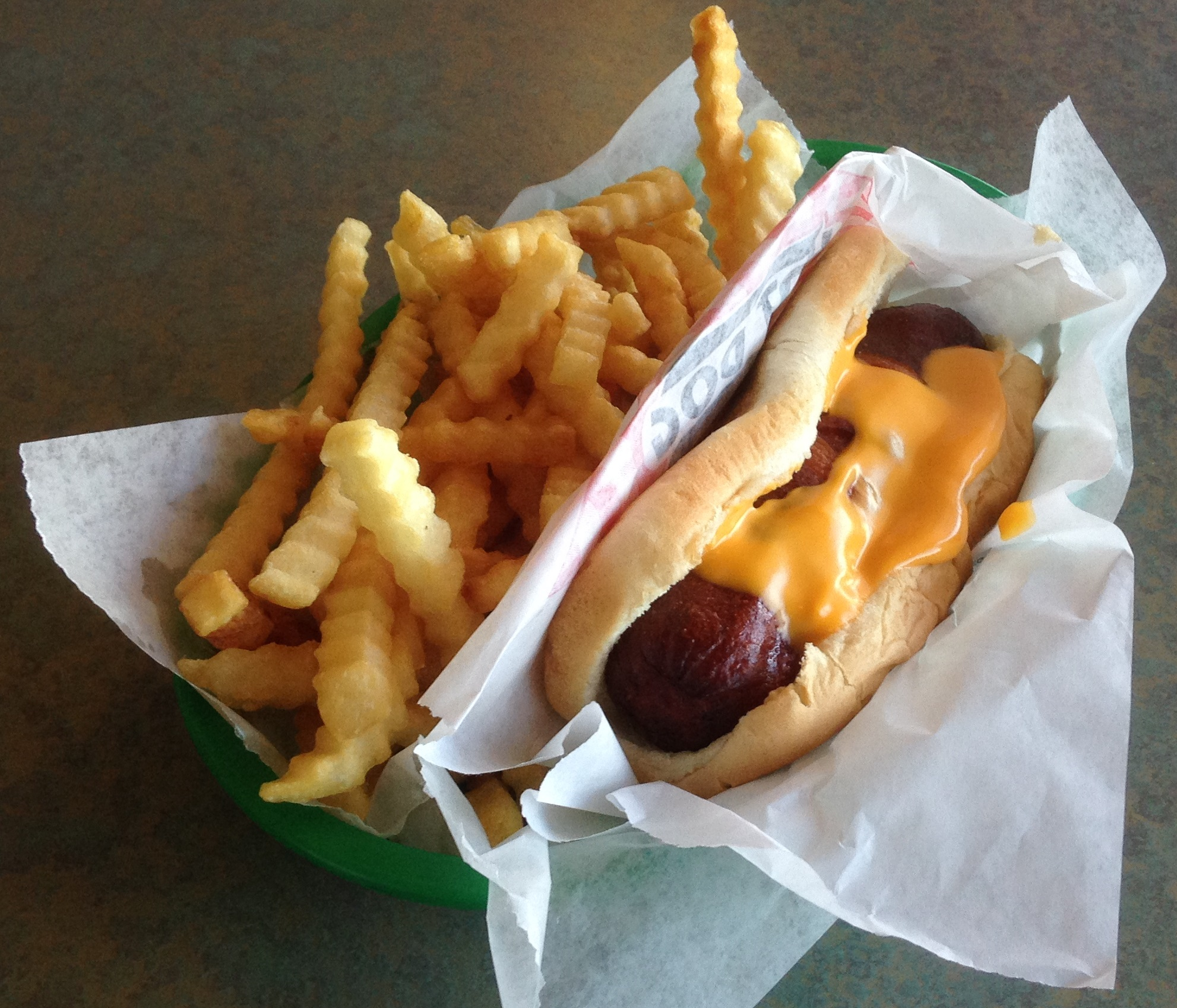
A francheezie with a side of fries; the cheese is on top instead of inside

== Bacon-wrapped ==
In Los Angeles, the danger dog is known as the bacon-wrapped hot dog. Vendors can be found cooking them on a stainless-steel baking tray over Sterno heat sources outside of bars, concerts, sporting events, and other late night establishments. The bacon-wrapped usually consists of a bacon-wrapped hot dog, grilled onions, bell peppers, ketchup, mustard, mayonnaise, and grilled jalapeño peppers. After a public campaign in 2010, the L.A. City Council proclaimed the bacon-wrapped to be the official hot dog of Los Angeles.

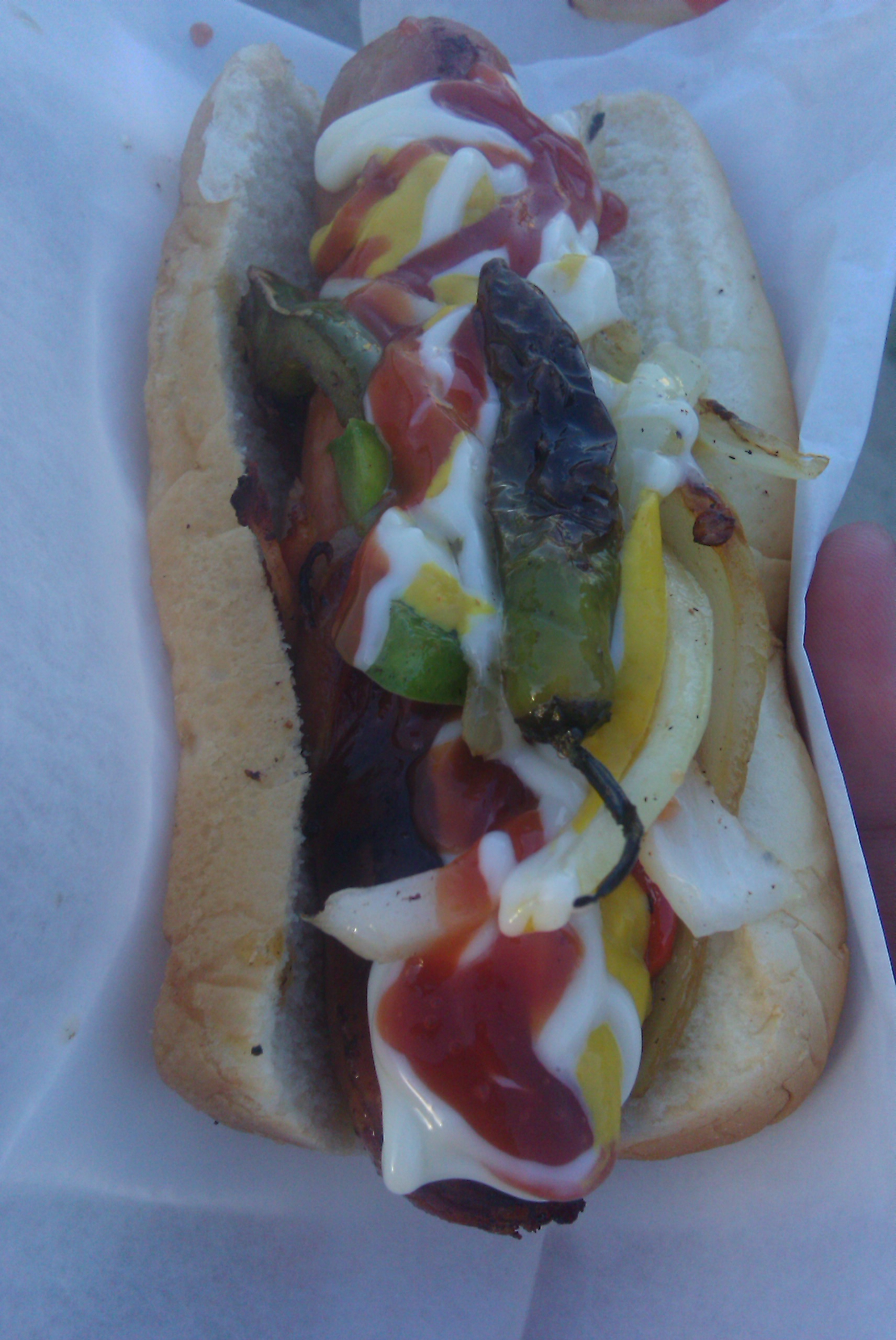
A bacon-wrapped

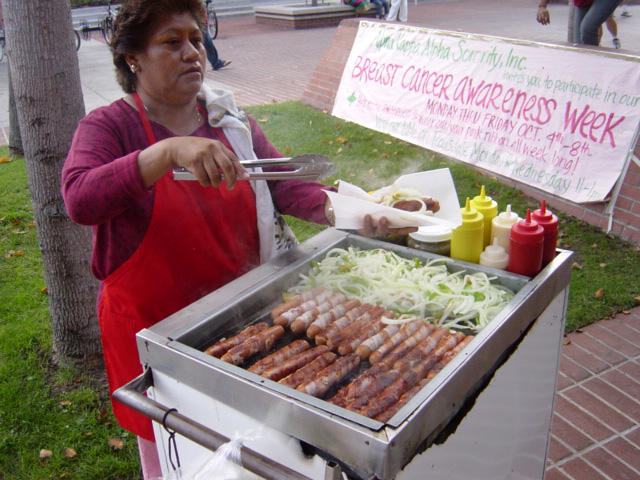
Bacon-wrapped hot dog vendor in Los Angeles

== Jersey breakfast dog ==
In New Jersey and elsewhere on the East Coast, there is a variation called the Jersey breakfast dog. This is a bacon-wrapped, deep-fried hot dog with melted cheese, on top of a fried or scrambled egg.

== Mission dog ==
In San Francisco, the bacon-wrapped hot dog is also called a Mission dog after the Mission District, the area of the city where it was originally sold. It is typically served with grilled onions, mustard, ketchup, mayonnaise, and jalapeños.

== Texas Tommy ==
The Texas Tommy is found in Philadelphia and elsewhere in eastern Pennsylvania. Like a francheezie, it is a hot dog that is split and filled with cheese before being wrapped with bacon. The Texas Tommy can be either deep-fried, broiled, or grilled.

== See also ==
- List of hot dogs
