= Statton =

Statton is a surname. Notable people with the surname include:

- Alison Statton (born 1958), Welsh singer
- Christopher Statton (born 1977), American artist and arts administrator, community activist, and philanthropist
- Percy Statton (1890–1959), Australian army officer

== See also ==
- Staton
