= Ben's Chili Bowl =

Restaurant in Washington, DC

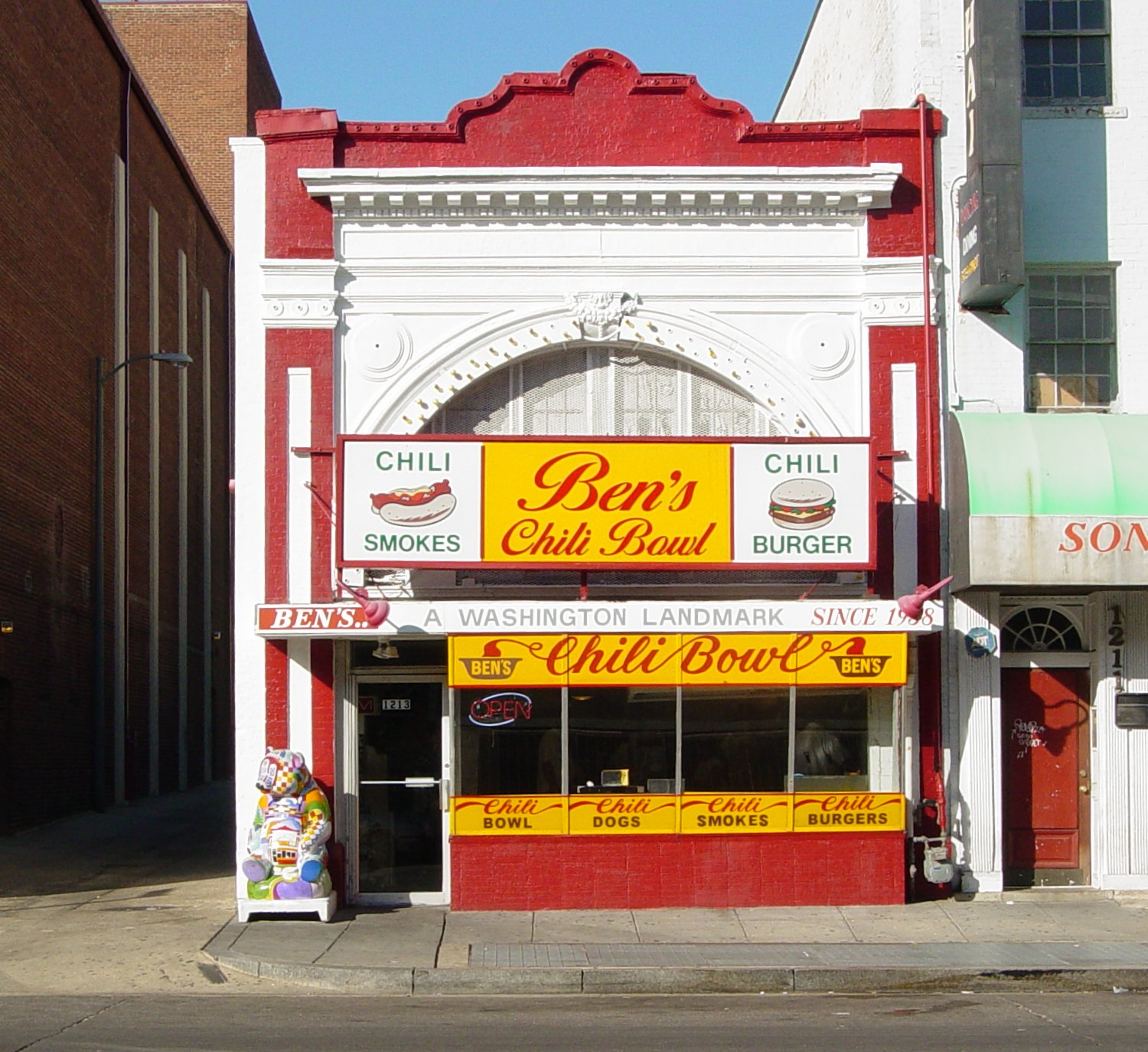
- Ben's Chili Bowl, Northwest Washington, D.C.
- Interactive map of Ben's Chili Bowl

Restaurant information
- Established: August 22, 1958; 68 years ago
- Owner: Virginia Ali
- Food type: American
- Dress code: Casual
- Rating: Yelp: Zagat: 22 out of 30 (Food)
- Location: 1213 U Street, NW, Washington, D.C.
- Coordinates: 38°55′02″N 77°01′44″W
- Website: benschilibowl.com
- Minnehaha Nickelodeon Theater (now Ben's Chili Bowl)
- U.S. Historic district – Contributing property
- District of Columbia Historic District
- Built: 1909; 117 years ago
- Built by: District Amusement Company
- Architect: P.A. Hurlehaus
- Architectural style: Renaissance Revival
- Part of: Greater U Street Historic District (ID98001557)

Significant dates
- Designated CP: December 31, 1998; 27 years ago
- Designated DCHD: January 11, 1999; 27 years ago

Ben's Chili Bowl is a restaurant in Washington, D.C., United States, located at 1213 U Street, next to Lincoln Theatre, in the U Street Corridor, also known as the Cardozo/Shaw neighborhood in Northwest D.C. It is known locally for its chili dogs, half-smokes, and milkshakes, and has been part of the U Street neighborhood since its founding in 1958. It was frequented by both police and protesters during the 1968 Washington, D.C., riots, and has been visited by celebrities, such as Anthony Bourdain, Chris Tucker, and President-elect Barack Obama in January 2009.

== History ==
Ben's Chili Bowl was founded on August 22, 1958, by Ben Ali, a Trinidadian-born immigrant of Indian descent who had studied dentistry at nearby Howard University, and his fiancée, Virginia Rollins. The two were married seven weeks after opening the restaurant. The building they chose was that of Washington's first silent movie house, the Minnehaha, which was established in 1911. The building is a contributing property to the Greater U Street Historic District. Most of the furniture in the restaurant is original to the 1950s. At the time, U Street was known as "Black Broadway". A number of jazz greats of the day, such as Duke Ellington, Miles Davis, and Nat King Cole, would stop by the restaurant when they performed at U Street clubs.

The U Street corridor was devastated by the April 1968 riots that followed the assassination of Martin Luther King Jr. During the riots, black activist Stokely Carmichael, leader of the Student Nonviolent Coordinating Committee, asked Ben to keep his restaurant open, and the Alis obtained permission to stay open past curfew. The restaurant fed both the police officers and firefighters working to impose order on the neighborhood, as well as the black activists. The violence and arson reached such an extent that Ben wrote "Soul Brother" in soap on the front window in the hopes that it would stop the angry mobs.

The destruction of so many businesses led to the flight of residents towards the suburbs and the economic decline of the neighborhood through the mid-1970s to mid-1980s. As the area became known for its drug addicts, Ben's Chili Bowl reduced its staff to one employee. Ben and Virginia's son Kamal recalled, "We stayed and had a following, because the Chili Bowl was like the neighborhood barbershop. People would sit here and chat. There was always a family presence and the locals protected us." The restaurant stopped serving pies and cakes, which attracted addicts, while police conducted surveillance on drug dealers from an upstairs window of the building.

The extensive construction of the U Street Metro station across the street from the restaurant, completed in 1991, forced still more U Street businesses to close. However, Ben's Chili Bowl stayed open to feed the construction workers. The Washington Post commented that Ben's Chili Bowl is "probably the only business on this strip that survived both the 1968 riots and the construction phase of the Metro Green Line". The Metro and lower crime rates helped the gradual revitalization and gentrification of the neighborhood. From the early 1990s, business revenues grew by 10% annually, to $1.5 million in 2005, and the number of employees at the restaurant grew as well, to a staff of 20.

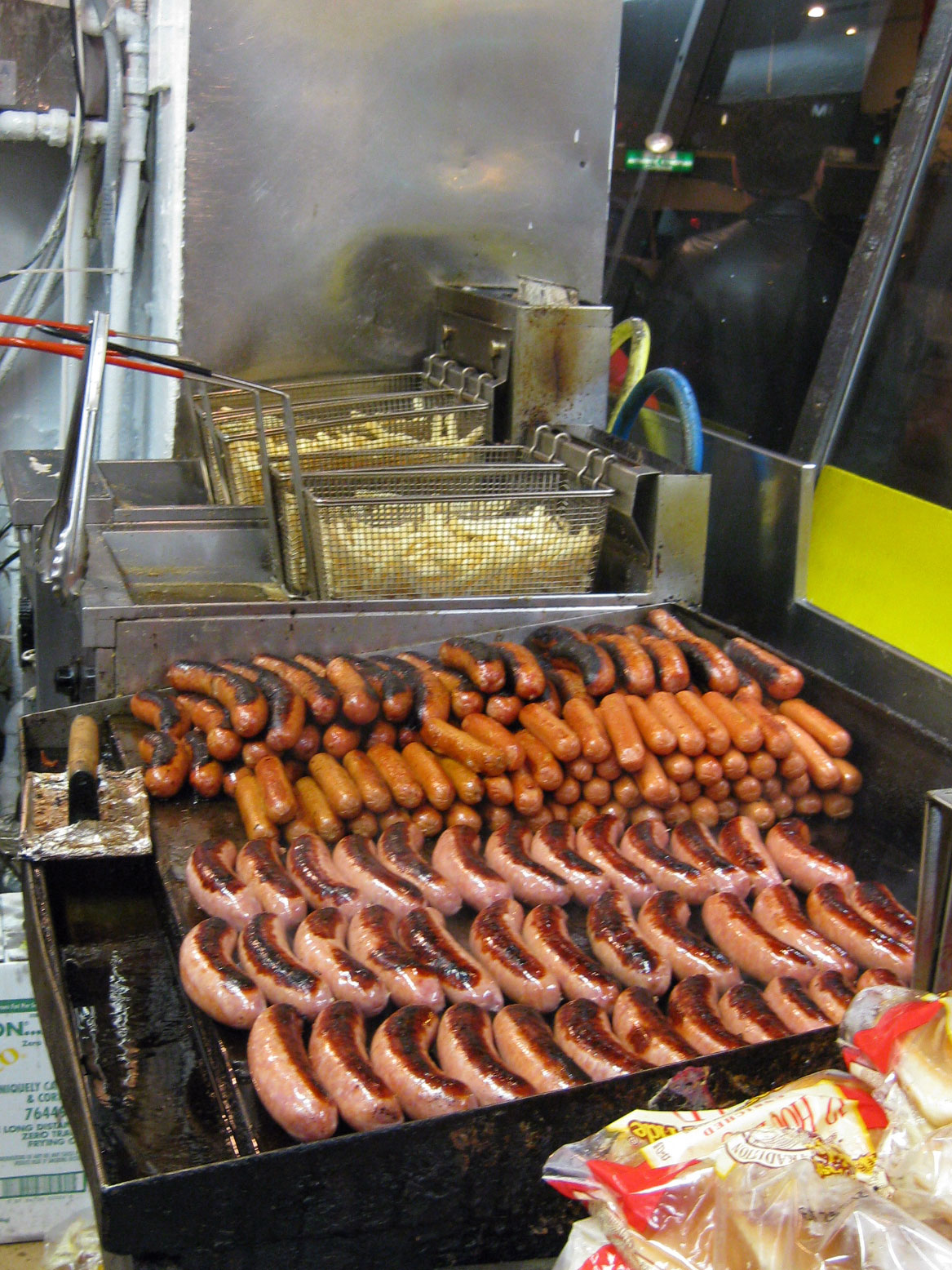
The grill inside Ben's Chili Bowl

In the summer of 2007, the owners of Ben's led a coalition of ten small local businesses to broker a deal with a local energy company to convert operations to 100% wind energy. The New York Post quoted Nizam Ali as saying, "We see this as part of being involved in what is good for the neighborhood, what's good for the city....It's a good idea that helps the environment and, it turns out, makes economic sense for all of us."

In 2008, Ben's Chili Bowl opened a second location in the newly built Nationals Park, though it has a more limited selection than the original restaurant.

On October 7, 2009, Ben died at the age of 82. He and his wife, Virginia, had retired from the restaurant business, having passed daily operations of Ben's Chili Bowl to two of their sons, Kamal and Nizam, while their third son, Sage, assisted. Ali's death was mourned in multiple ways throughout the city, including a written statement by Mayor Adrian Fenty, which read in part: "I am deeply saddened to hear of the passing of the founder and namesake of Ben's Chili Bowl, one of the greatest treasures in the District of Columbia. Ben Ali was a man who invested his life in a small business that weathered multiple storms and became the soul of a neighborhood and the pride of our city."

In 2009, Ben's sons, Nizam and Kamal, opened an upscale restaurant and bar, Ben's Next Door, at 1211 U St, NW, adjacent to the original building. Featuring alcohol (something not available in Ben's), the restaurant's goal is to "complement" Ben's, according to Nizam, who says that the goal is to stay "true to ourselves". The restaurant offers everything on the Ben's Chili Bowl menu from 11 am to closing, in addition to its lunch, dinner, and a late-night menu.

In 2014, the first location outside of DC opened in Arlington on Wilson Boulevard. It closed in 2020 during the COVID-19 pandemic.

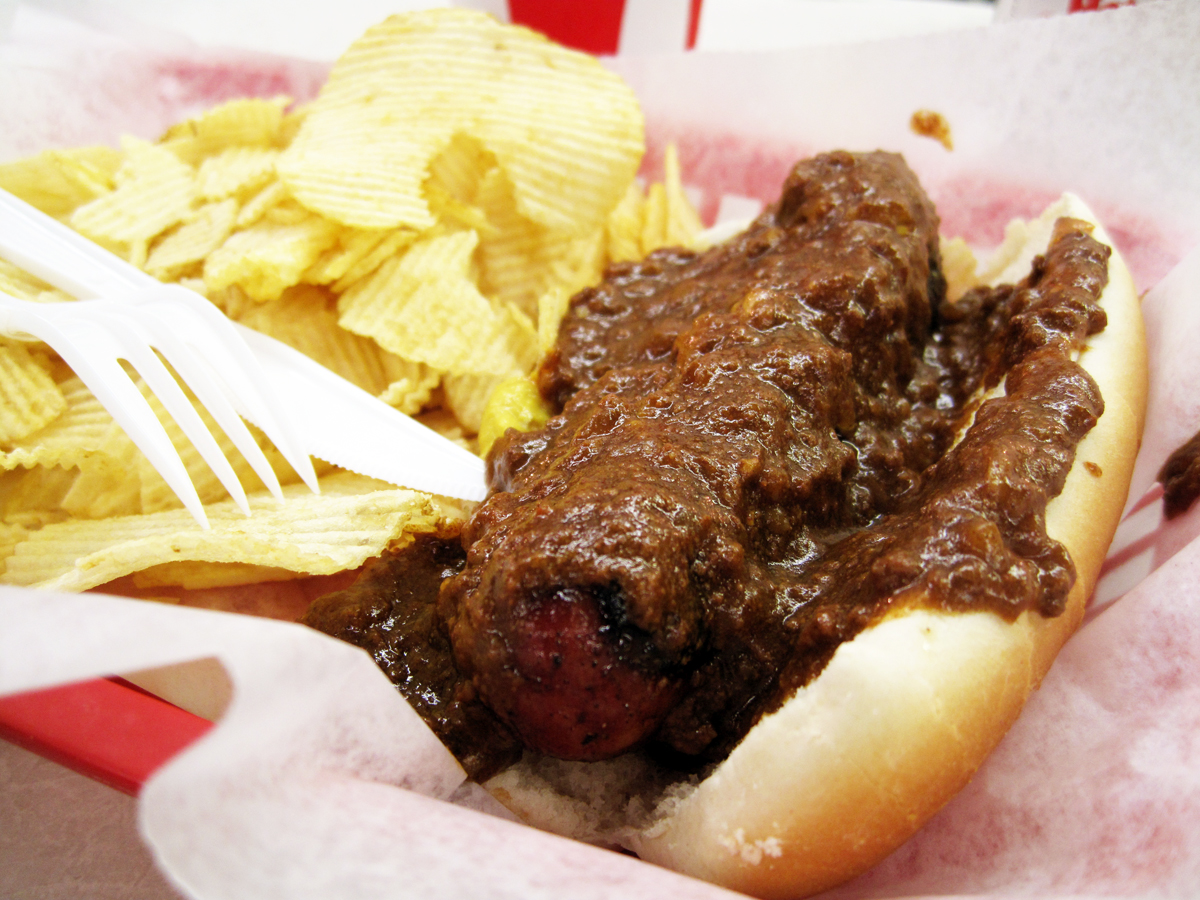
A chili half-smoke with potato chips at Ben's

== Customers and recognition ==
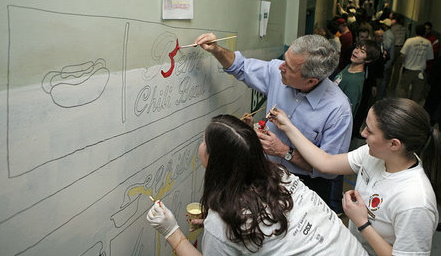
Then-U.S. President George W. Bush helping to paint a D.C. school mural of local landmark Ben's Chili Bowl.

The Boston Globe described Ben's diverse customers as "punk-looking kids and fashionable business people and everyone in between". In 2001, Ben and Virginia's son, Kamal, commented on the changes of what types of people were eating at the establishment: "You hear comments. Even the white customers. They want to think they're the only whites who'd been hip enough to go to the Chili Bowl. Now they look around and there are a lot of other whites and they are not so happy about it."

The most famous regular customer is comedian Bill Cosby, who took his future wife to Ben's when they were dating. He recalls that he first became a frequent visitor while serving in the Navy and stationed in Bethesda, Maryland, in 1958 and frequently visited the U Street jazz clubs. Cosby recalls that during some of his visits with Camille, who was then a student at the University of Maryland, he would "eat as many as six half-smokes at a time." Cosby returned to Ben's in 1985 to hold a press conference in the restaurant to celebrate the success of his television series, The Cosby Show. He continues to stop by Ben's while in town for servings of half-smokes. A sign posted in the restaurant proclaimed that Bill Cosby is the only person who eats for free at Ben's Chili Bowl. On November 3, 2008, a new sign was posted to add "the Obama family". Starting in 2012 a large mural featuring Cosby adorned the building, but was removed in January 2017 amid sexual assault allegations against the comedian.

Many other celebrities, including Chris Tucker and Bono, have visited over the years. When journalist Ted Koppel stopped hosting news program Nightline, he held his 2005 farewell party at the restaurant. Then-President-elect Barack Obama ate at Ben's on January 10, 2009.

The Washington Post asserts, "By the late 1990s, no D.C. politician would dream of running for office without dropping into Ben's." Anthony A. Williams appeared at Ben's immediately after his successful mayoral election.

In 1998, former DC mayor Marion Barry described having traveled to Ghana and meeting the Mayor of Accra, an alumnus of Howard University, whose greeting was, "Glad to have you in Accra. Is Ben's Chili Bowl still there?" And when French President Nicolas Sarkozy and his wife Carla Bruni visited Washington, D.C., in March 2010, they reportedly each had two of Ben's half smokes during their visit to the restaurant.

Scenes from films including The Pelican Brief and State of Play have been filmed in the restaurant, and it has been in "dozens of TV shows." The short film Breakfast At Ben's was filmed almost entirely in the restaurant. The documentary Traveling While Black, a virtual reality project about racism, makes use of the restaurant as the main filming location in 2019. Additionally, it has been used in novels as the setting for fictional meetings—especially meetings that involve individuals from "different sides of the law"—as it was in George Pelecanos's King Suckerman.

Ben and Virginia Ali were inducted into the D.C. Hall of Fame, and in 1999, the alley adjacent to the restaurant was renamed "Ben Ali Way". On the occasion of Ben Ali's 2009 death, D.C. mayor Adrian Fenty released a statement calling the restaurant "one of the greatest treasures in the District of Columbia".

=== Reviews ===
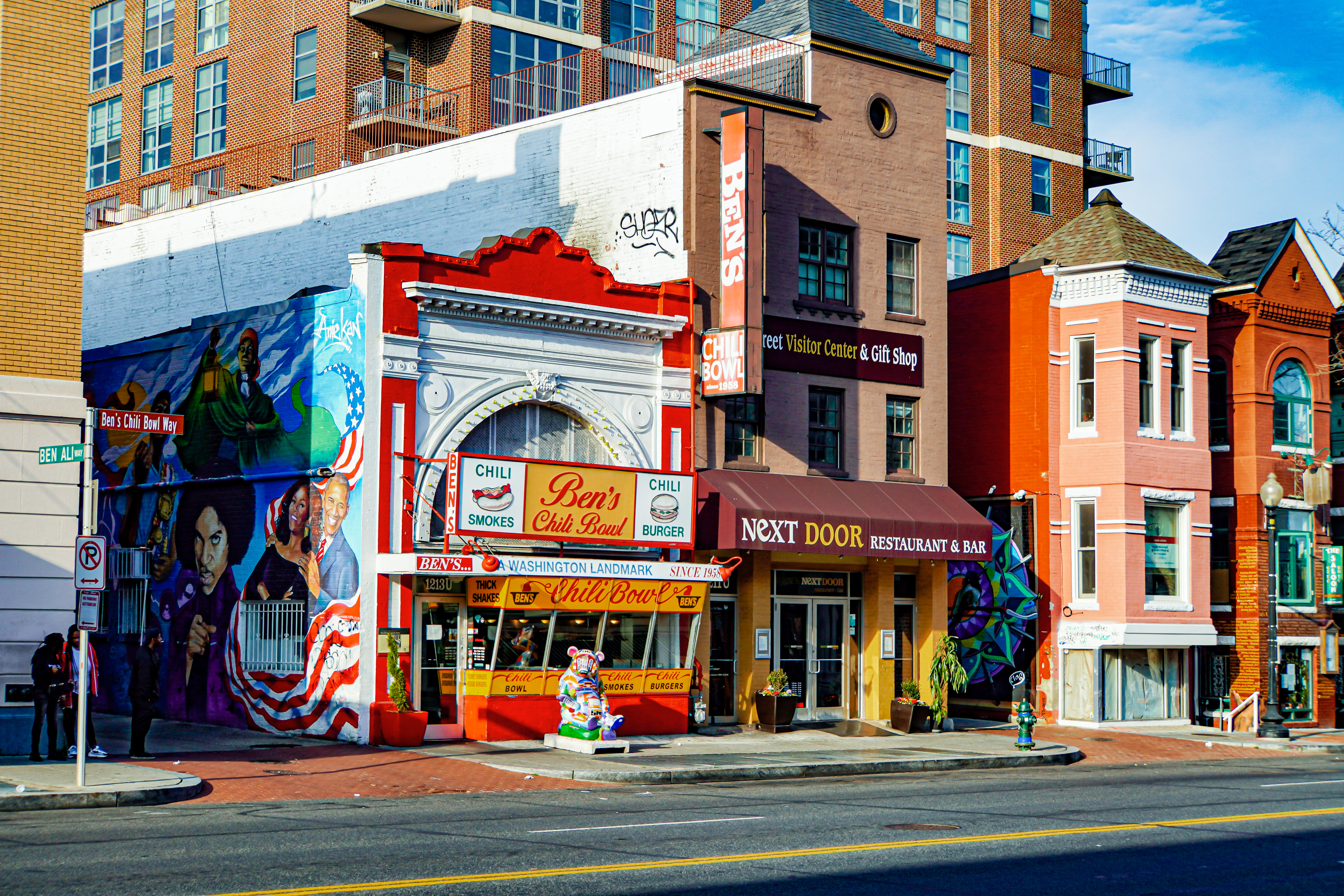
A mural is painted on the western wall of the restaurant.

In 2004, the James Beard Foundation named Ben's one of the "down-home eateries that have carved out a special place on the American culinary landscape". Michael Stern, a writer specializing in U.S. regional foods, penned a 2008 review raving "The half-smoke is sensational!" and "Ben's serves one of the best sweet potato pies anywhere", and describing the chili as "sensational stuff: thick, peppery, full-flavored and positively addictive". In January 2009, food magazine Bon Appétit named Ben's one of the country's ten "Best Chili Spots", asserting, "No reasonable discussion of great chili joints can take place without mention of this U Street institution." In a 2016 The Washington Post restaurant review, Ben's received one star and the food was described as "awful."

== See also ==
- List of James Beard America's Classics
