= Ben Ali (businessman) =

Trinidadian-American restaurateur (1927–2009)

Mahaboob Ben Ali
- Born: Mahaboob Ben Ali; 13 June 1927; San Juan, Trinidad and Tobago
- Died: 7 October 2009 (aged 82); Washington, D.C., U.S.
- Education: Howard University
- Occupations: Businessman, restaurateur
- Known for: Founding Ben's Chili Bowl
- Spouse: Virginia Ali
- Children: 3

Mahaboob Ben Ali (13 June 1927 – 7 October 2009) was a Trinidadian American businessman and restaurateur. Ali co-founded Ben's Chili Bowl, a landmark restaurant located on U Street in Washington, D.C., with his wife, Virginia Ali, in 1958. Ben's Chili Bowl has since attracted presidents, celebrities and politicians.

== Biography ==
Mahaboob Ben Ali was born in San Juan, Trinidad and Tobago, on 13 June 1927. He was the firstborn child of seven in a Muslim Indo-Caribbean family. Ali's grandparents had immigrated to Trinidad from British-ruled Northern India as indentured laborers. He was raised in the town of San Juan, which is located east of the capital city of Port of Spain. Ali moved to the United States in 1945 as a student. Ali, who had studied such poets as Wordsworth, Chaucer and Shakespeare while in Trinidad, originally planned to become a medical doctor. Ali enrolled at the University of Nebraska, but suffered a broken back as the result of a fall down an elevator shaft while at the school. He spent months recovering from the accident. Following his recovery, Ali attended four separate universities before earning his bachelor's degree from Howard University in Washington, D.C.

Due to Islamic prohibitions against consuming pork, Ben Ali never consumed some of his restaurant's popular offerings.

Man vs. Food – S02E12 – Washington, D.C. was made in tribute to him.
