= Half-smoke =

American hot dog

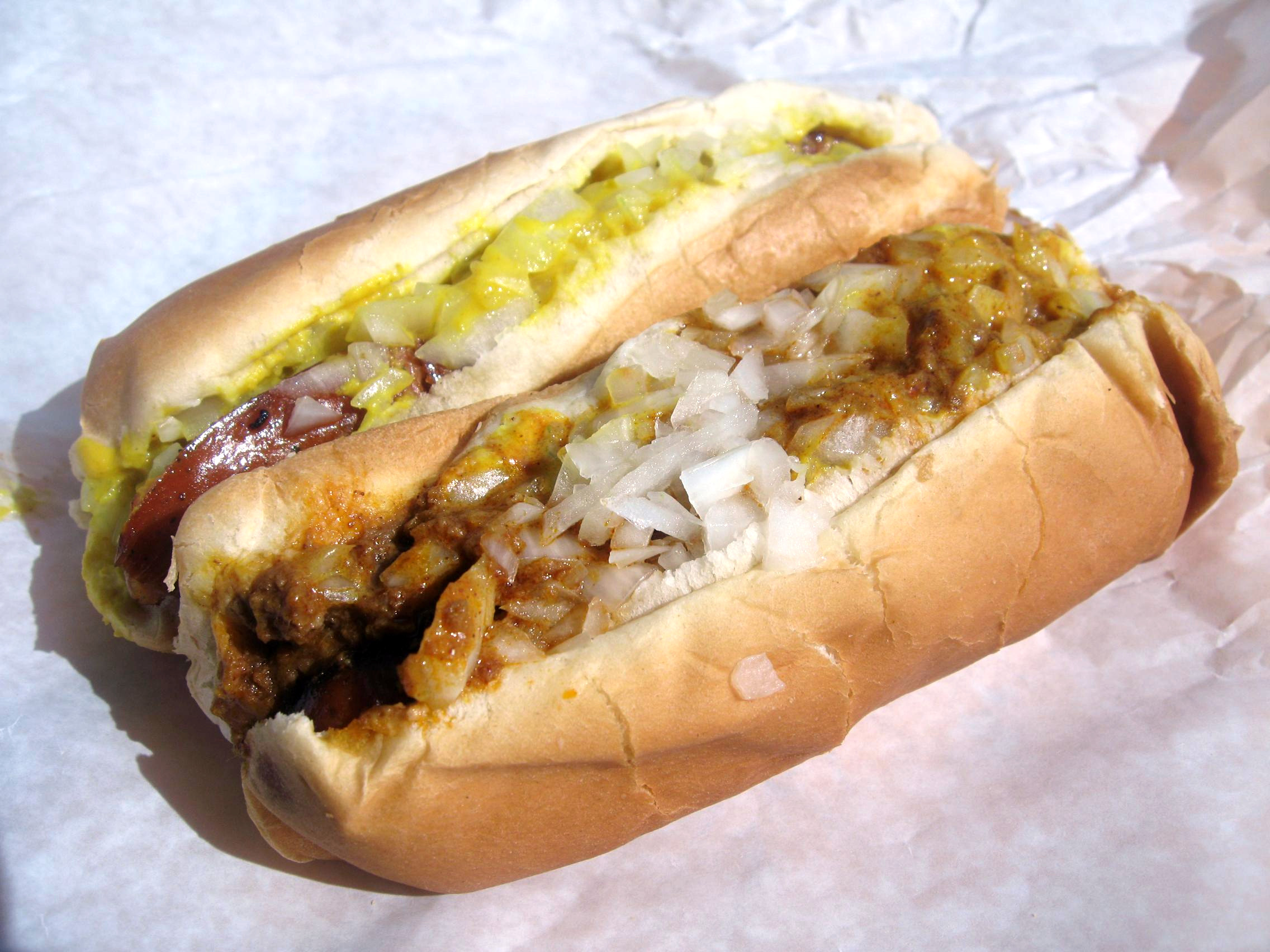
- Half-smokes from Weenie Beenie
- Course: Main course
- Place of origin: United States
- Region or state: Washington, D.C.
- Serving temperature: Hot
- Main ingredients: Pork, beef

A half-smoke is a type of hot dog found in Washington, D.C., and the surrounding region. Larger, spicier, and with more coarsely-ground meat than a regular hot dog, the sausage is often half-pork and half-beef, smoked, and served with herbs, onion, and chili sauce.

== Ingredients and preparation ==
The etymology of "half-smoke" possibly comes from the original half-pork, half-beef composition, the ingredients and smoked method of preparation. Another possible explanation is that the texture and flavor is halfway between smoked sausage and a regular hot dog. Yet another explanation is that it refers to cooks cutting the sausage in half when grilling. Composition of the sausages varies by brand and some brands even make more than one kind. A half-smoke can be half pork, half beef, all beef, or anything in between. It can be steamed instead of smoked.

== History ==
The company thought to be the originator of the sausage, Briggs & Company, was sold by its owner, Raymond Briggs, in 1950 without clarifying the origin of the name. The products sold under the name generally have a genuine or artificial smoke flavoring and coarser texture than a regular hot dog; these are the key features that distinguish them.

Briggs started selling his half-smokes in about 1930. Eventually, Briggs was sold to another meat distributor, where, by some accounts, the quality of the meat declined.

== Venues ==
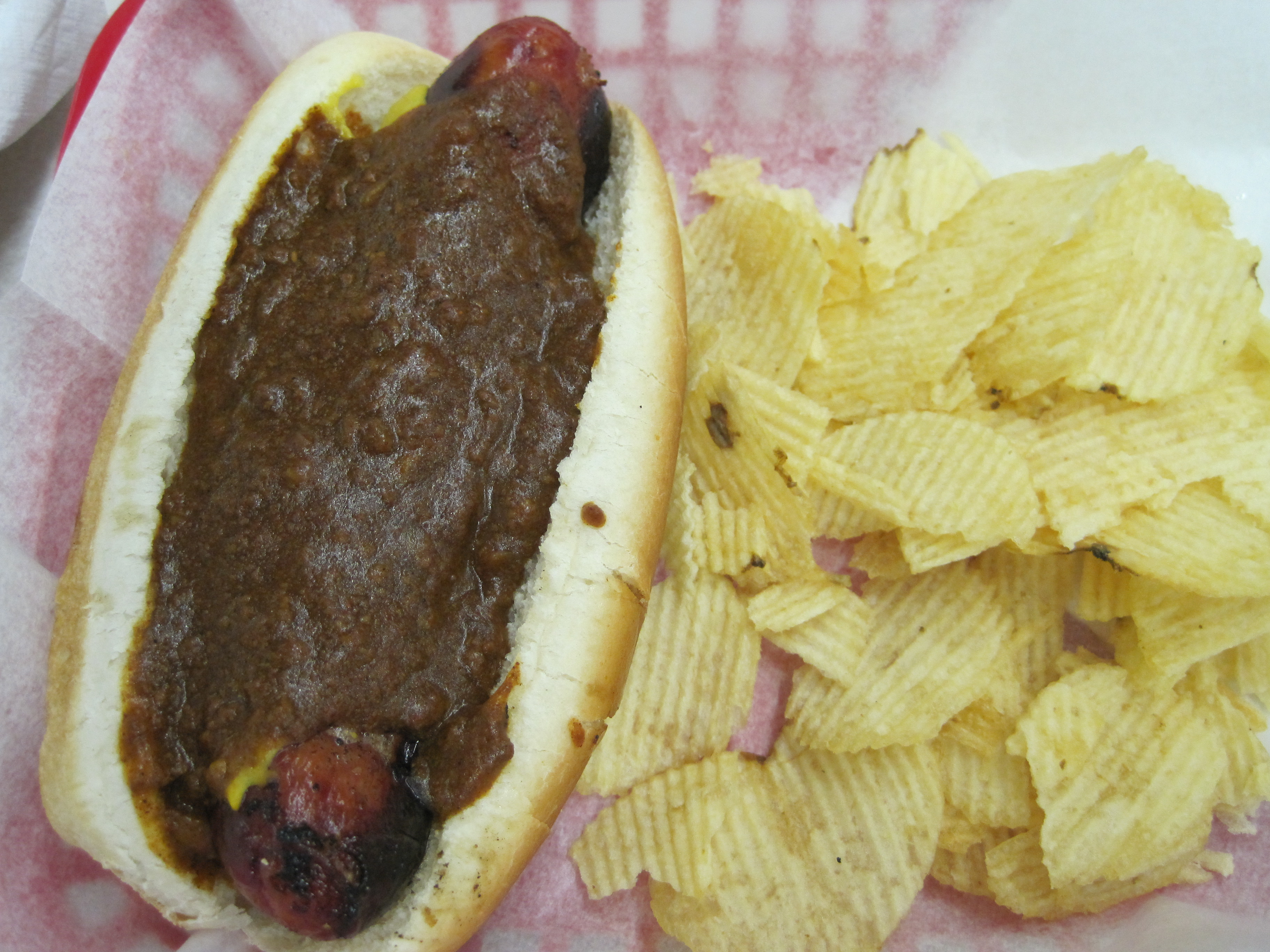
A half-smoke with potato chips from Ben's Chili Bowl

Numerous hot dog carts in Washington, D.C., sell steamed half-smokes, with those on Constitution Avenue catering to tourists and those on Pennsylvania Avenue and many other hot dog carts throughout the downtown area serving federal employees. Half-smokes are the "official dog" of the Washington Nationals. The most prominent location is often cited as Ben's Chili Bowl in Washington's U Street neighborhood, which has long been a center of Black Washington, and was an essential stop for President-elect Barack Obama in 2009.

Another popular location for half-smokes is the Weenie Beenie in South Arlington, Virginia, located near the Washington & Old Dominion Railroad Regional Park trail. Founded in 1950, it pre-dates Ben's Chili Bowl. Among newer purveyors is Meats & Foods, on Florida Avenue just east of Ben's Chili Bowl, which makes its own handmade version of the sausage.

== See also ==
- Chili dog
- List of hot dogs
- List of sausages
- List of smoked foods
