= Chili dog =

Hot dog with chili

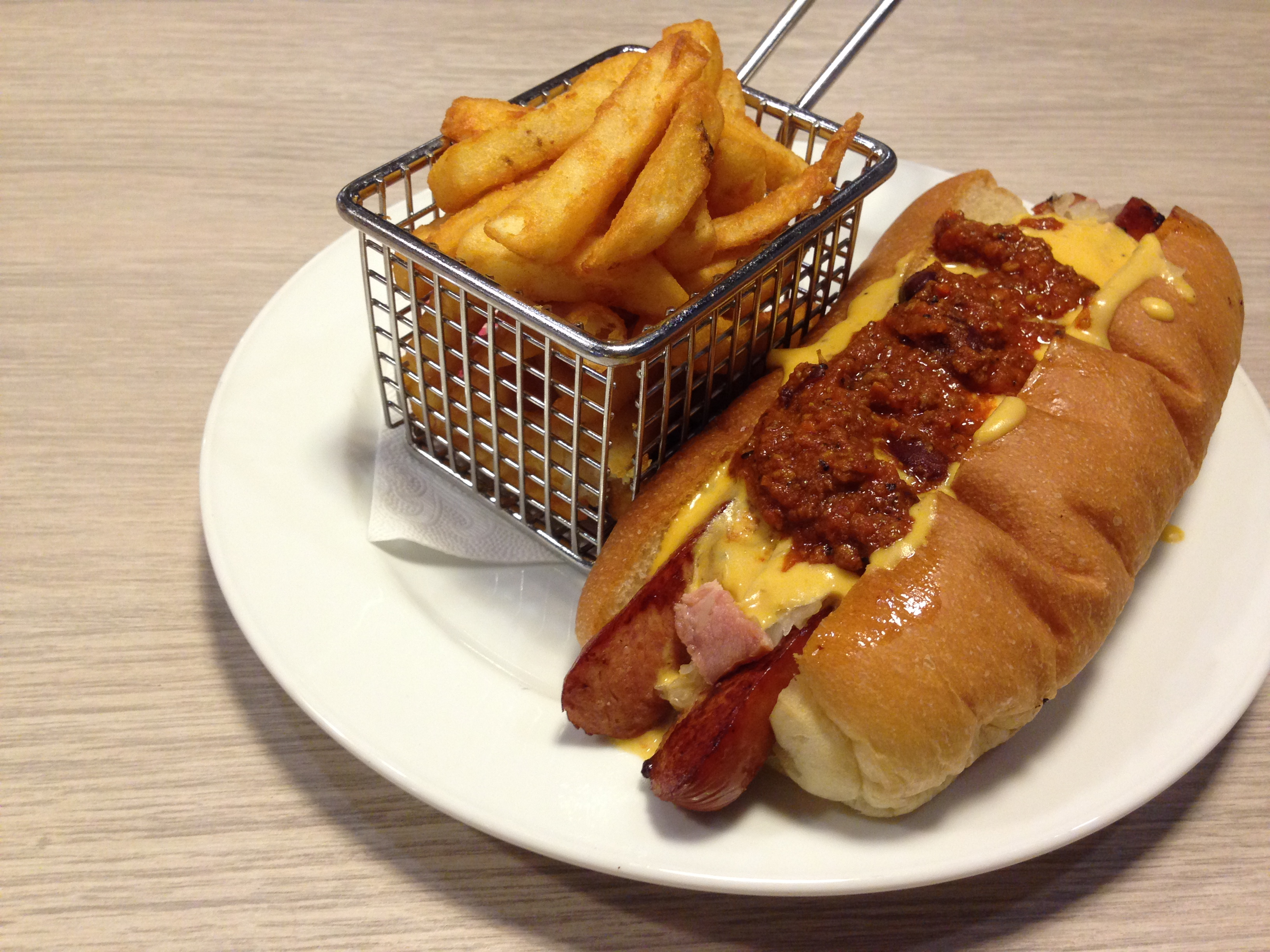
- A chili-cheese dog served with a side of fries
- Type: Hot dog
- Place of origin: United States
- Main ingredients: Hot dog bun, hot dog, chili con carne; often cheese, onions, mustard
- Variations: Michigan dog, half-smoke

A chili dog is a savory hot dog served in a bun and topped with a meat sauce, usually chili con carne. Additional toppings may include cheese, onions, and mustard. The style has multiple regional variations in the United States, many calling for specific and unique sauce ingredients, types of hot dogs, or types of buns, and referred to regionally under region-specific names. It is commonly served as a casual food in settings such as diners, fast-food establishments, and sporting events. And is well known for being used in the midwest.

== Regional variations ==
=== Texas wiener ===
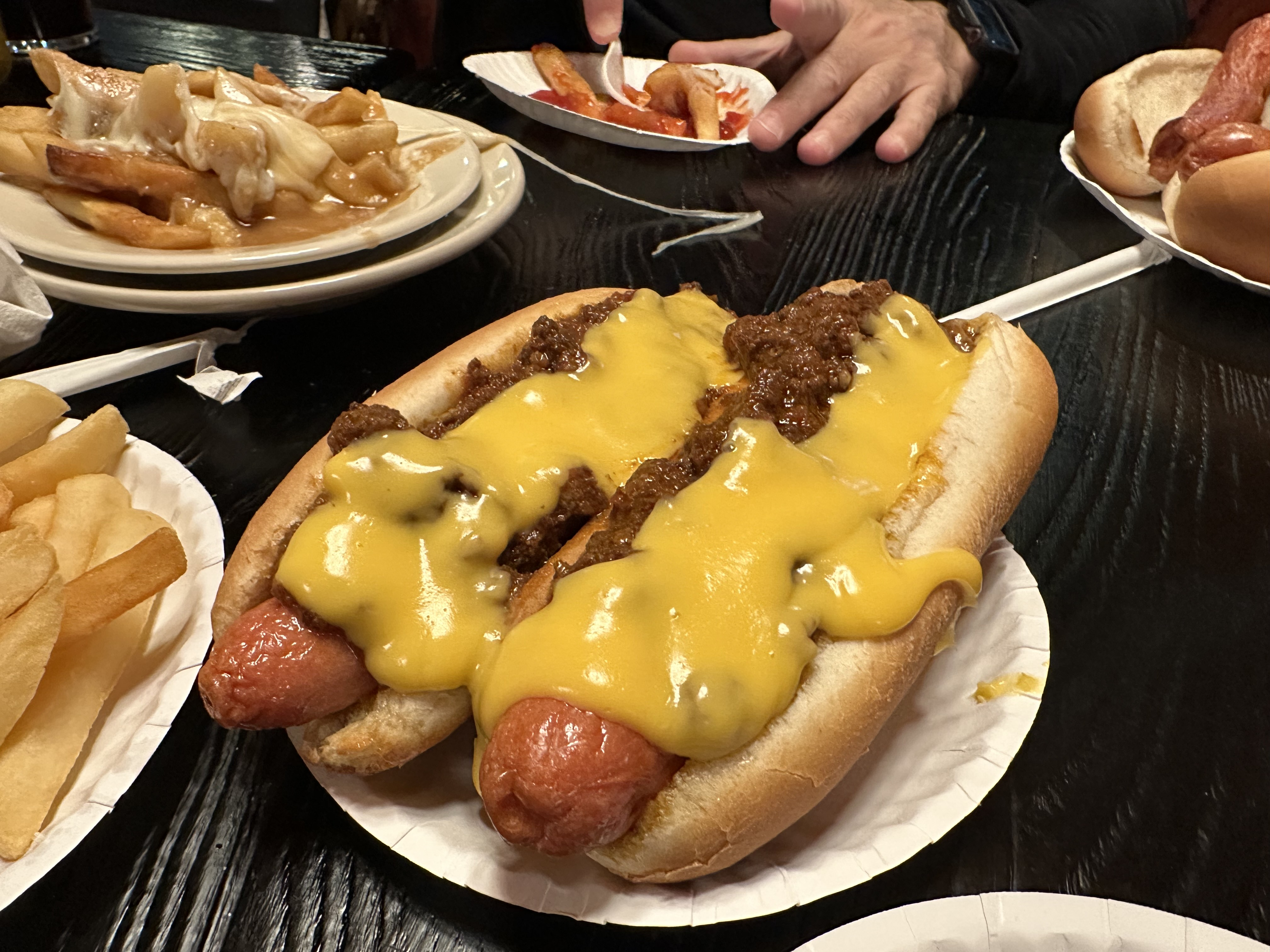
Two chili–cheese hot dogs from Rutt's Hut in Clifton, New Jersey

In New Jersey and Pennsylvania, the "Texas hot dog," "Texas chili dog," "Texas hot," or "Texas wiener," is a hot dog with chili or hot sauce; it is served in variations with assorted condiments. The Texas wiener was created in Paterson, New Jersey, before 1920 and in Altoona, Pennsylvania, by Peter "George" Koufougeorgas in 1918 and originally called Texas Hot Wieners. The "Texas" reference is to the chili sauce used on the dogs. It is considered a unique regional hot dog style, partly because in addition to the chili or hot sauce, the hot dog itself is always deep-fried. From its origins, the invention spread to the Pennsylvania cities of Scranton and Philadelphia. By the 1920s, it had reached Western New York, where numerous long-standing hot dog stands continue to exist, including a stand run by the Rigas family (dating to 1921) and Ted's Hot Dogs (which opened in 1927).

=== Coney Island hot dog ===
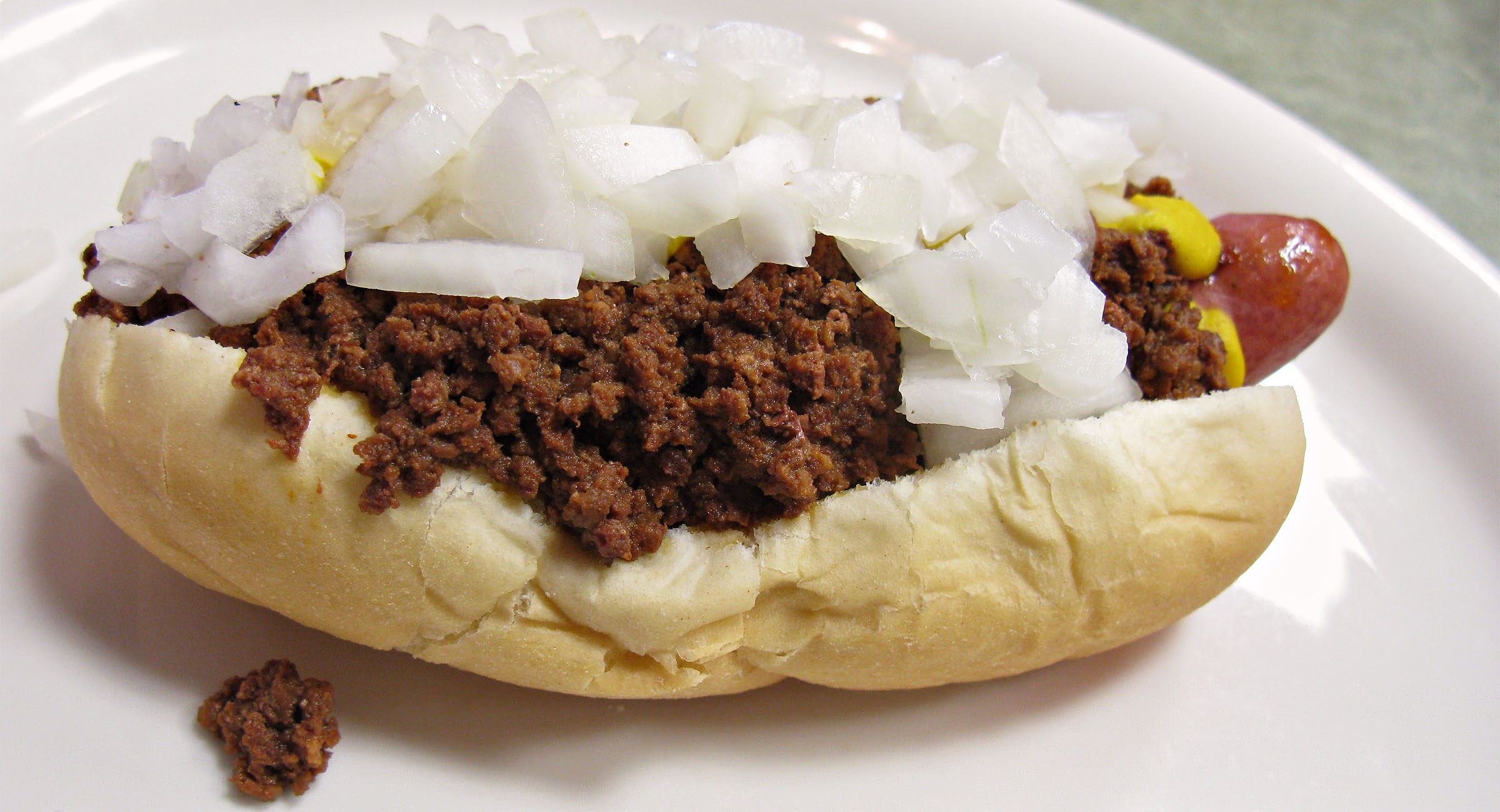
A Flint-style Coney Island hot dog with a raw onion topping

In southeastern Michigan, a Coney Island hot dog is a European-style Frankfurter Würstel (Vienna sausage) of German origin with a natural lamb or sheep casing, topped with a beef heart-based sauce, which was developed by Macedonian and Greek immigrants in the area. It has several local variations, including Detroit-style, Flint-style, and Jackson-style.

In Pottsville, Pennsylvania, The Coney Island — founded by Greek immigrants in 1917 — was advertising its hot wieners "With Real Chili Sauce" in the Pottsville Republican by 1936, and continues to serve them.

=== Hot wiener ===
In Rhode Island, the hot wiener or New York System wiener is a staple of the food culture and is served at "New York System" restaurants. The traditional wiener is made with a small, thin hot dog made of veal and pork, giving it a different taste from a traditional beef hot dog, served in a steamed bun, and topped with celery salt, yellow mustard, chopped onions, and a seasoned meat sauce.

=== Michigan hot dog ===
In the North Country of New York State, a Michigan hot dog, or "Michigan", is a steamed hot dog on a steamed bun topped with a meaty sauce, generally referred to as "Michigan sauce."

=== Cheese coney ===
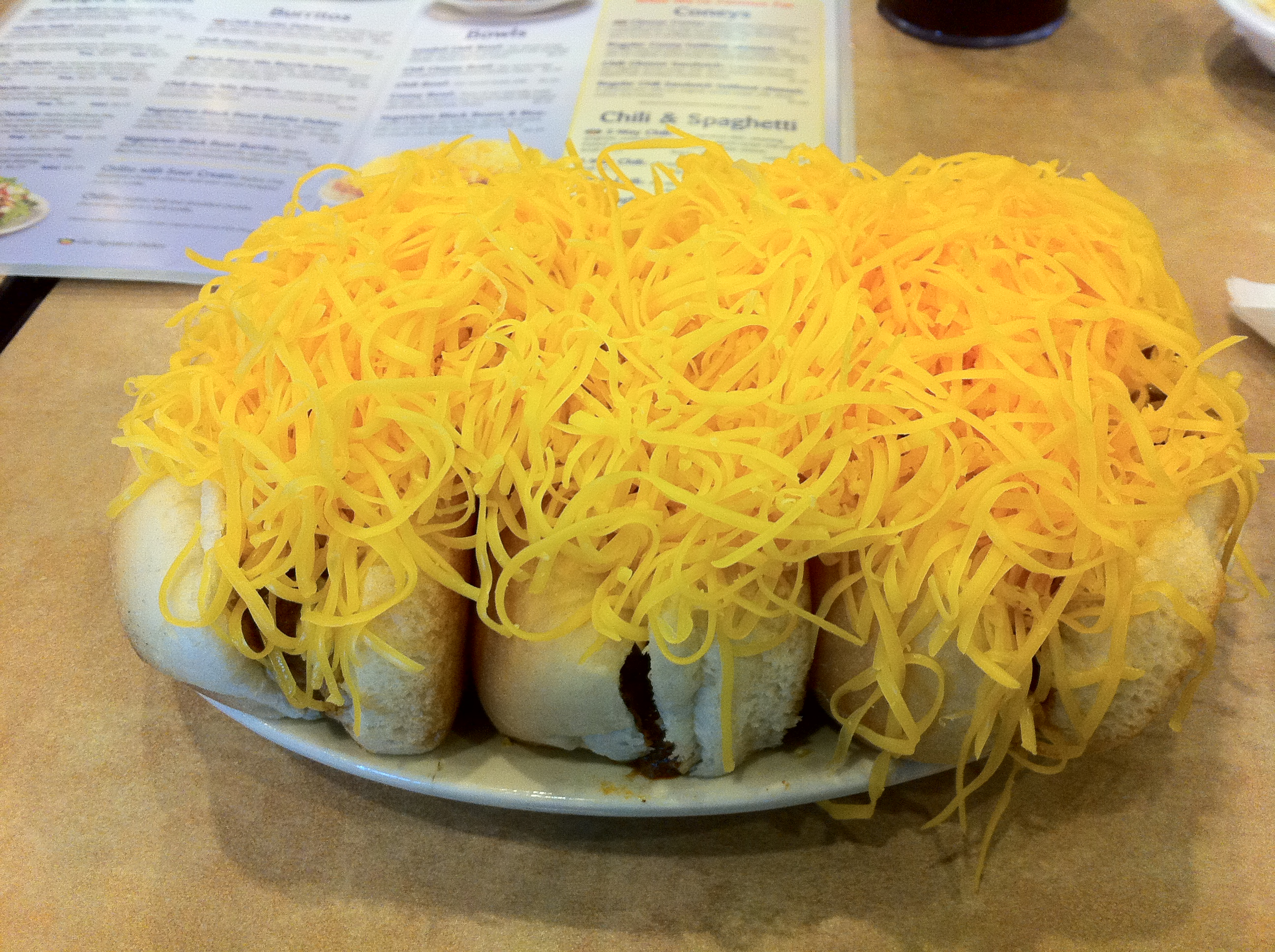
Cheese coneys

In Greater Cincinnati, as well as parts of northern Oklahoma, such as in Tulsa and Stillwater, Oklahoma, cheese coneys or Coney Islands (without the cheese) are hot dogs in buns topped with Cincinnati chili (a Greek-inspired meat sauce), onions, mustard, and cheese.

=== Carolina-style ===
In North Carolina, hot dogs topped with chili, onions, and either mustard or slaw are referred to as "Carolina-style", which is also used to refer to hamburgers with similar toppings.

=== Half-smoke ===
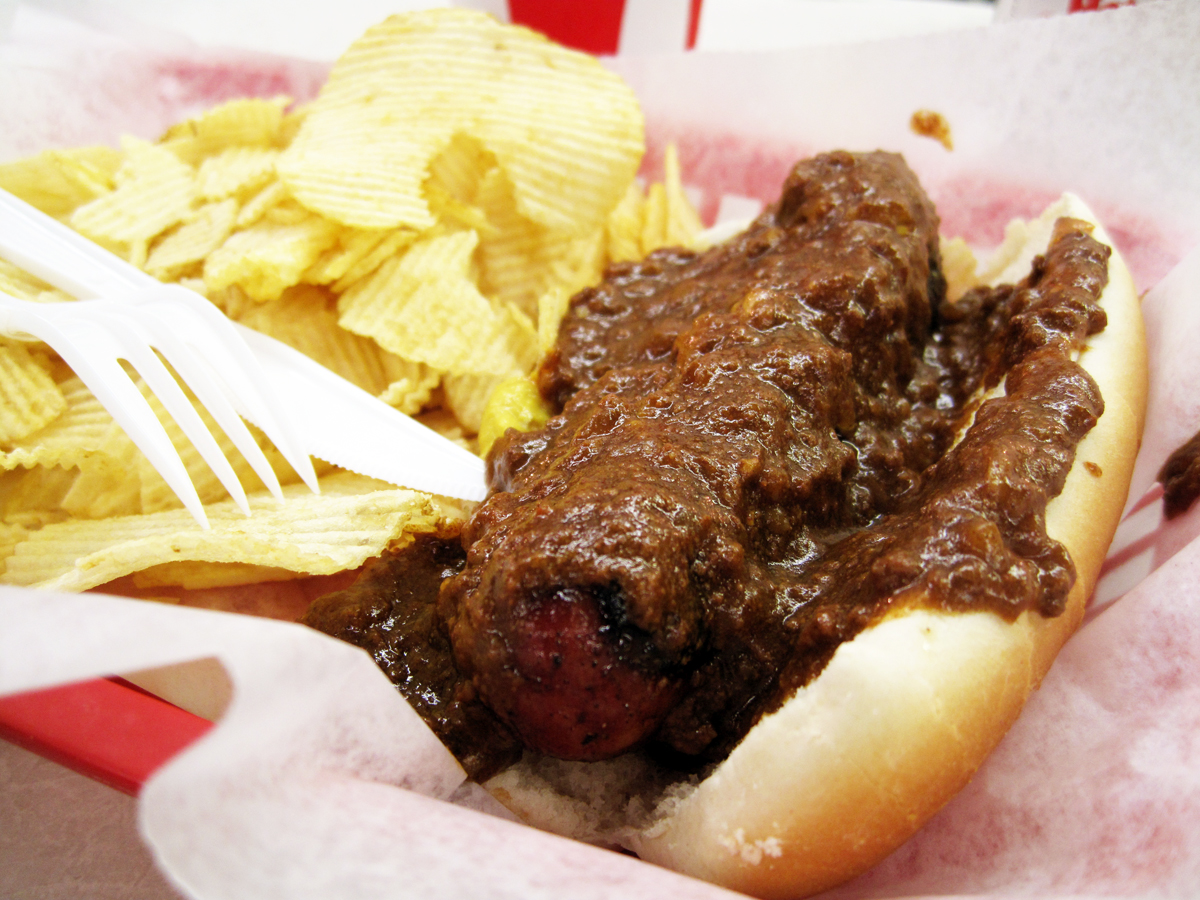
A half-smoke

In Washington, D.C., the half-smoke is similar to a hot dog, but usually larger, spicier, and with more coarsely-ground meat. The sausage is often half-pork and half-beef, smoked, and served with herbs, onion, and chili sauce.

== In popular culture ==
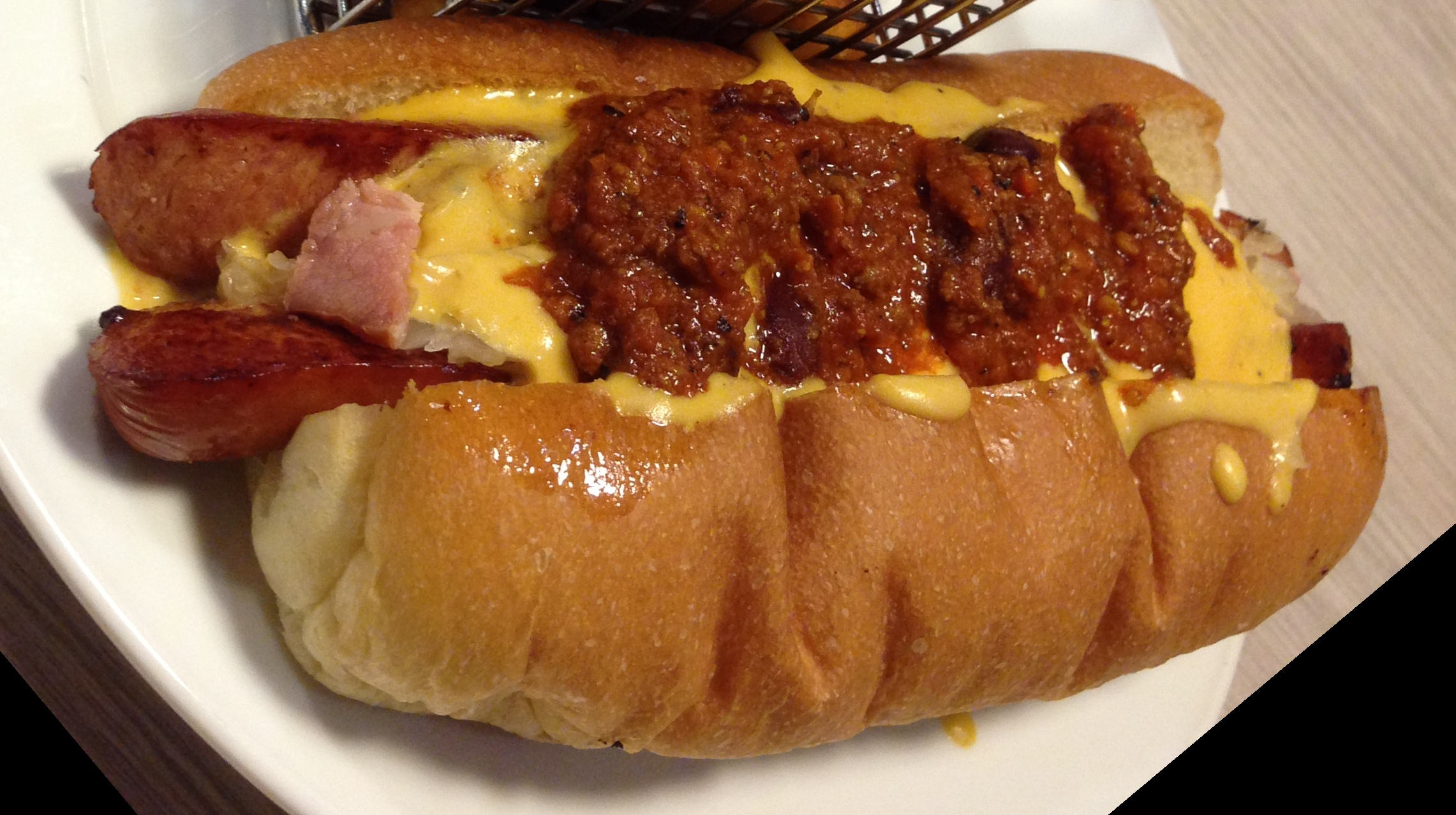
This is another photo of a chili dog with fries

this is the chili dogs cousin hot dog

In the video game series Sonic the Hedgehog, Sonic the Hedgehog is known for having chili dogs as his favorite food.

== See also ==
- Chili burger
- Hot dog variations
- List of hot dogs
- List of sausage dishes
- Sonic the Hedgehog
