= Staton =

Staton is a surname, of English origin and may refer to:

People

- Aaron Staton, American actor
- Adolphus Staton (1879 – 1964), American Sailor, Medal of Honor recipient
- Albert Staton (1899 - 1980), American Sportsman
- Bill Staton (1929–2006), American pool player and restaurateur
- Candi Staton (born 1940), American soul and gospel singer
- Cecil Staton (born 1958), American politician from Georgia
- Dakota Staton (1930–2007), American jazz vocalist
- David Alan Dave Staton (born 1968), American Baseball player
- Dolly Staton (born 1932), American athlete
- Ken Staton (born 1972) American golfer
- Jim Staton (1927–1993), American football player
- Joe Staton (born 1948), American illustrator and comic book writer
- John Staton (1902 - 1990), American Football Player and Business Executive
- Josephine L. Staton (born 1961), American federal judge
- Mick Staton (1940–2014), American politician from West Virginia
- Rebekah Staton, British actress
- Sarah Staton (born 1961), British sculptor
- William Staton (1898–1983), British aviator and RAF officer

Others

- Staton Correctional Facility a prison in Alabama
