= Weenie Beenie =

Fast food restaurant in Arlington, Virginia, United States

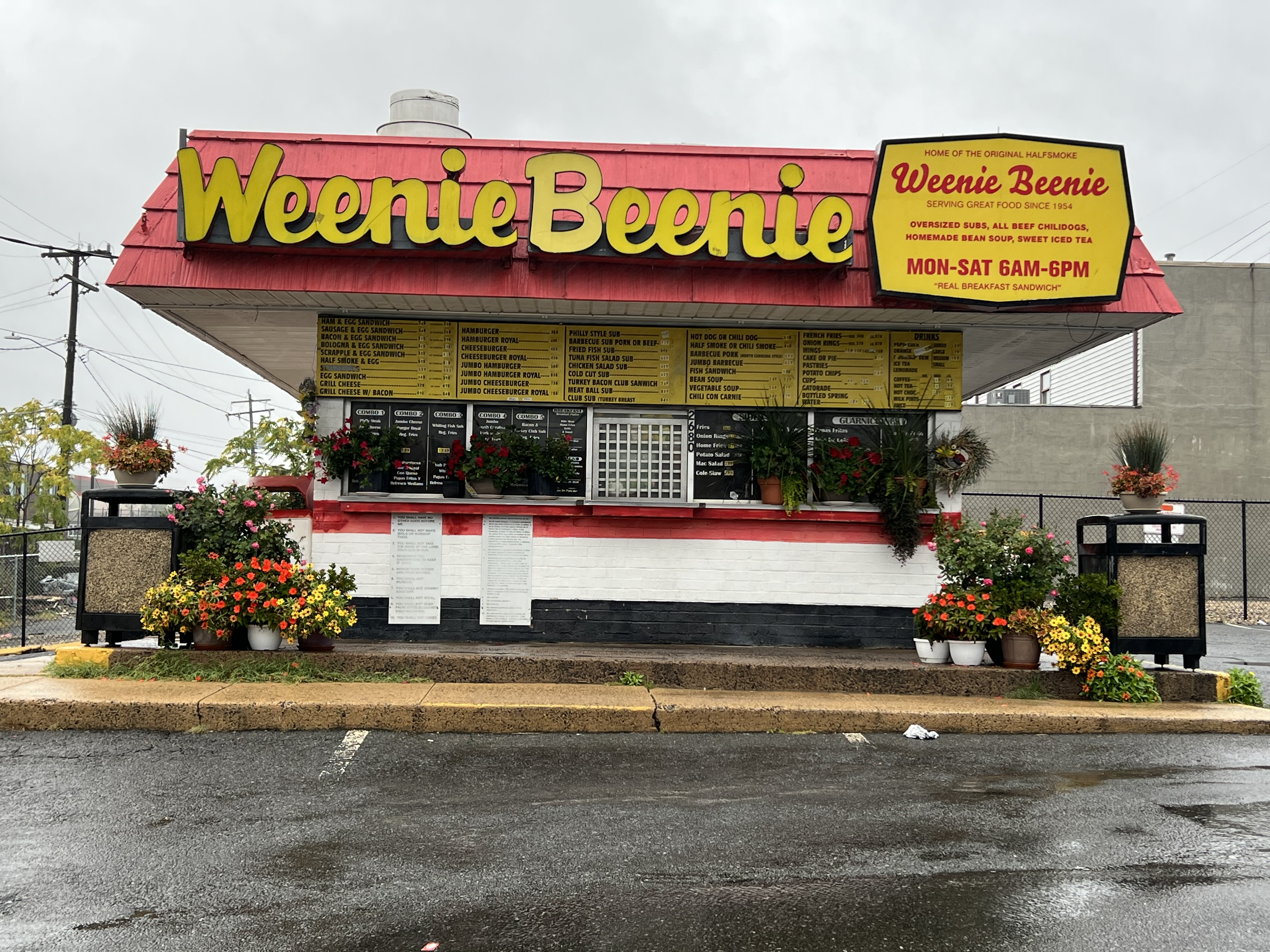
Weenie Beenie in Arlington County, Virginia, in October 2022

Weenie Beenie is a fast food restaurant, formerly part of a chain. Weenie Beenie predominantly sells half-smokes, hot dogs, pulled pork sandwiches, and soft drinks.

Weenie Beenie was founded by Carl and Bill Staton in Arlington, Virginia in 1950. Bill, a billiards player, used money from his pool playing to fund the restaurants, which numbered six at one time. Bill was also known by the nickname "Weenie Beenie". The final Weenie Beenie is the original location, in the Shirlington section of Arlington. It is now particularly well known for its half-smokes.

Dave Grohl, frontman for the band Foo Fighters and a former Washington metropolitan area resident who also lived in the Del Ray area of Alexandria, Virginia, titled a song on the Foo Fighters' first album "Weenie Beenie" after the restaurant.

== See also ==
- List of hot dog restaurants
