= Virginia Ali =

American business owner

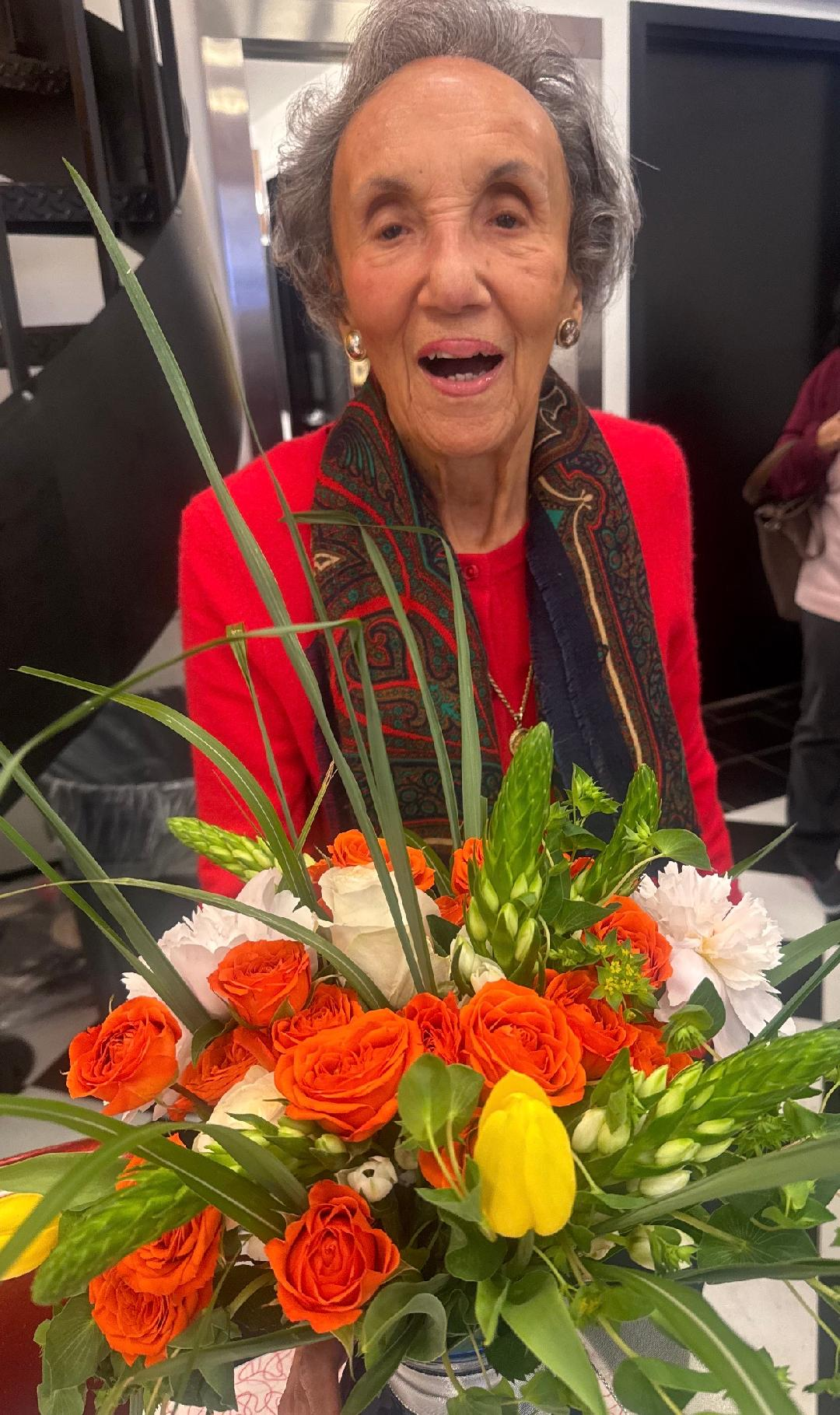
- Ali at Ben's Chili Bowl Grand Re-Opening (2026)
- Born: Virginia Rollins; December 17, 1933 (age 92)
- Known for: Ben's Chili Bowl
- Spouse: Ben Ali

Virginia Ali (née Rollins; born December 17, 1933) is an American business owner known for co-founding Ben's Chili Bowl in Washington, D.C.

== Early life ==
Ali was born on December 17, 1933, and is of African American and Native American descent. She was raised in rural Virginia and was educated in a segregated school system. She moved with her family to Washington, D.C., in the 1950s.

== Career ==
After moving to Washington, Ali worked as a teller at Industrial Bank, a historic Black owned business. It was there that she met husband Ben Ali when he visited the bank to deposit money from a local restaurant where he worked.

Ali and Ben opened Ben's Chili Bowl on U Street in Washington, D.C., on August 22, 1958. Many famous entertainers frequented the family-run restaurant, in the heart of the Shaw neighborhood. The restaurant became a favorite late-night gathering place for the likes of Duke Ellington, Dinah Washington and Redd Foxx. Martin Luther King Jr., Jesse Jackson, and Stokely Carmichael often ate together at the Chili Bowl.

During the 1968 Washington, D.C., riots after the death of King, Ali kept the Chili Bowl open at the request of Stokely Carmichael.

Ali has served on the boards of several organizations, including For Love of Children.

== Awards and honors ==
Ali and her husband were inducted into the DC Hall of Fame in 2002. She and Ben received the Key to the City from mayor Adrian Fenty in honor of the restaurant’s 50th anniversary in 2008. Ali received an honorary Doctor of Public of Service from The George Washington University in 2026.

== Personal life ==
Virginia and Ben Ali were married on October 10, 1958; together they had three sons. Each of their children were given the middle name Ben in case they took over the restaurant. All three eventually became involved in running the restaurant after Ben's death.
