= Ted's Hot Dogs =

American fast food chain

- Type: Private
- Industry: Fast food
- Founded: March 24, 1927 in Buffalo, New York
- Headquarters: Buffalo, New York, USA
- Number of locations: 9
- Area served: New York, Arizona
- Key people: Spiro Liaros, President; Theodore "Ted" Spiro Liaros, Founder
- Products: Hot Dogs
- Website: tedshotdogs.com

Ted's Hot Dogs is a chain of hot dog restaurants based in Buffalo, New York. Founded on March 24, 1927 by Greek immigrant Theodore Spiro Liaros, Ted's Hot Dogs is a Western New York tradition based primarily upon their charcoal broiled hot dogs, as well as their homemade secret hot sauce, old-fashioned milk shakes, and handmade onion rings.

== History ==
Theodore Spiro Liaros first began his work with hot dogs by operating a horse drawn hot dog cart near the construction site of the then new Peace Bridge, connecting Buffalo with Canada. The sister of the construction site's foreman was using a tiny nearby tool shed to sell sandwiches to the workers and passersby. When the bridge was finished in 1927, she offered to sell the shack to Ted. So began Ted's Hot Dogs. At the time, a hot dog and drink cost $0.22.

In 1948 a second Ted's opened up in a northern Buffalo suburb, the Town of Tonawanda. In the following decades, Ted's would expand to Cheektowaga and Amherst. The menu expanded beyond just hot dogs and today you can find eight Ted's locations in the Buffalo area, with an additional one in Tempe, Arizona. and another in Gilbert, Arizona The chain has inspired other hot dog restaurants around the US.

== Menu ==
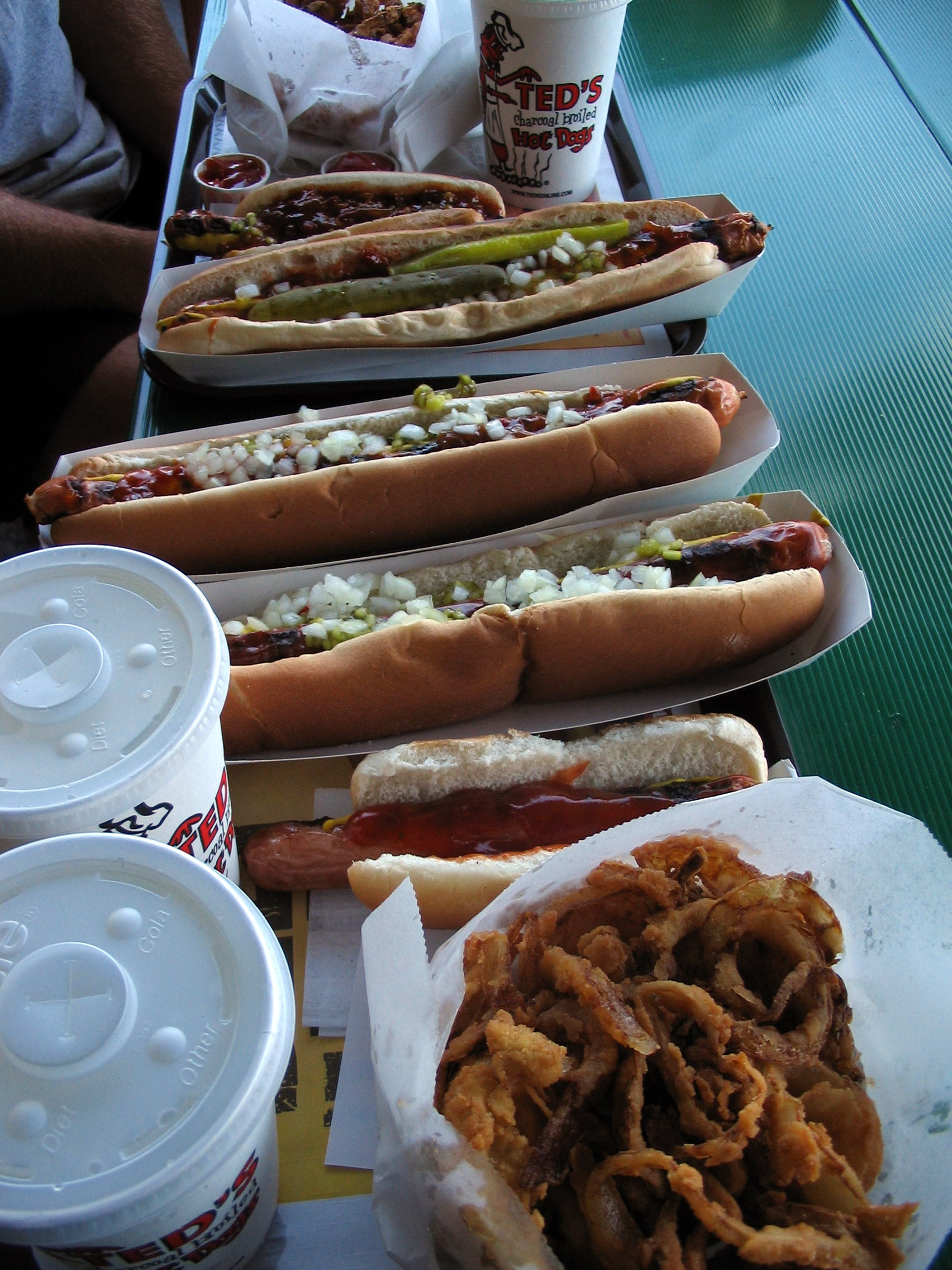
A sampling of the fare at Ted's Hot Dogs

Ted's menu focuses on their charcoal hot dogs broiled to order. Regular, foot-long and jumbo all beef are available. Fries and the Buffalo-famous Loganberry beverage are frequent side items. Ted's sells a wide variety of grilled foods including burgers, Italian and Polish sausage and vegetarian hotdogs.

Handmade milkshakes and homemade onion rings round out the average meal, while options of sausage, chicken, and french fries are also available. Buffalo-famous Loganberry is also a frequent drink selection.

"Ted's Famous Hot Sauce" is generally a staple for many visitors and can be purchased by the jar.
