= Bill Staton =

American pool player and restaurateur

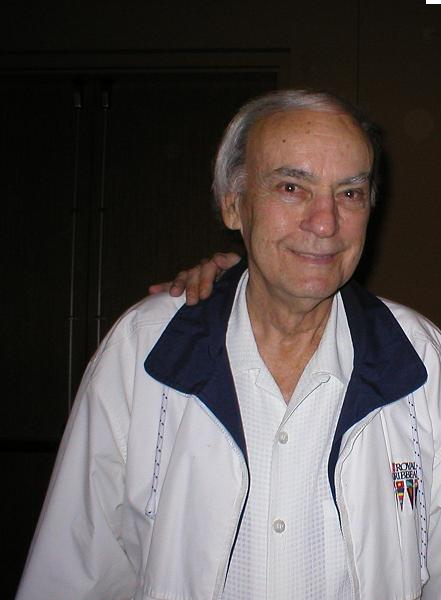
Bill "Weenie Beenie" Staton at the 2003 US Open Nine-ball Championship

William Paul Staton (born Billy Paul Staton; May 23, 1928, in Concord, North Carolina, US – February 28, 2006, in Myrtle Beach, South Carolina), was an American professional pool player and restaurateur, nicknamed Weenie Beenie.

== Early life and career ==
Born Billy Paul Staton, he changed his name to William Paul Staton in the 1970s. He was the ninth and last child of Dexter Ellison Staton and Suda Bertha Moore Staton of the Brown-Norcott community of Concord, North Carolina.

In 1950, Bill Staton founded the Weenie Beenie hot dog stand chain in Northern Virginia, offering franks and beans, which is how Staton got the nickname. Business went well, and in 1968, with brother Carl Staton, they opened The Jack and Jill Cue Club in Shirlington, Virginia, one of the top-action pool rooms in the 1960s and 1970s, with 32 tables, a pro shop, a snack bar, and a tournament area that seated 180 with tiered seating. Jack and Jill's was a favorite stop for pool players and hustlers making games on the East Coast, open 24 hours a day for over 20 years. A second Jack and Jill Club would later be opened.

Bill Staton attended the University of North Carolina at Chapel Hill. He served in the U.S. Air Force during the Korean War.

== Professional career ==
Staton was regarded by others in the billiard circuit as the classiest gentlemen on the tournament pool circuit. He started playing pool at 22 years of age. He was hustled when his cook did not come to work and was at the pool hall down the street. Weenie Beenie waited for the cook to finish his game and lost $600.00 waiting, so he vowed to win it back. After he bought a pool table and practiced a couple months, he did! As his game developed, he used his pool earnings to support his business enterprises.

When he became an accomplished pocket billiards player, Staton made several appearances on "Wide World of Sports" and "The Tonight Show Starring Johnny Carson", "The Merv Griffin Show", the Steve Allen show, and was interviewed by David Frost. Bill Staton also appeared on the TV show "I've Got A Secret". His "secret" was the ability to sink a full rack of balls into the pockets. At the conclusion of the show on live TV he performed this trick shot of sinking all the balls in the pockets of the Pool Table with only one hit.

He toured with Bob Hope doing pool exhibitions for the US military. He performed trick shots in the Academy Award-winning film, The Color of Money, and is also credited with giving Rudolph "Minnesota Fats" Wanderone his nickname.

Some of Staton's titles include the 1972 Stardust Open One-pocket Championship in Las Vegas, and he won the Virginia State Pool Championship five times, as well as other tournaments. In the 1960s he won the European Billiard Championship.

An avid golfer, Staton played with Arnold Palmer and Jack Nicklaus, and so he moved to golfing haven Myrtle Beach after developing a love for the game.

Staton was inducted into the One-pocket Hall of Fame in 2004 as an inaugural member.

He died in Myrtle Beach, South Carolina in 2006.

== Personal life ==
He was married for 53 years to Norma Jean Skaggs (1930–2013) Together they had three children.

== Legacy ==
The first annual Weenie Beenie Memorial Nine-ball Tournament was held June 22–24, 2007, at Q-Masters Billiards in Norfolk, Virginia. The winner of the nine-ball event was Filipino Dennis Orcollo.

== Titles ==
- 1972 Stardust Open One Pocket Championship
