= Greek-American cuisine =

Cuisine of Greek Americans and their descendants

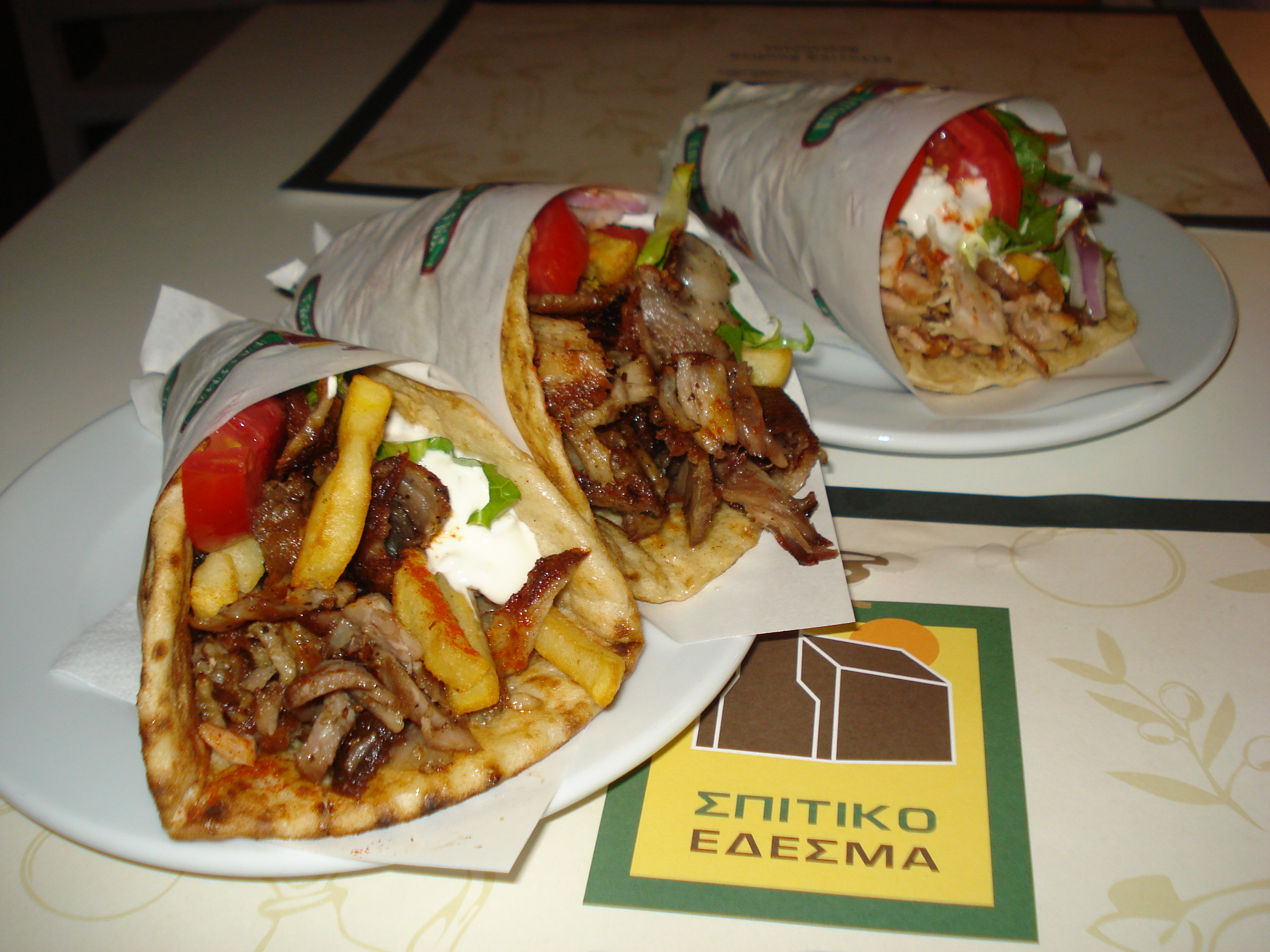
Greek American gyros, with meat, onions, olive oil, tomato, French fries, and tzatziki sauce rolled into a pita

Greek-American cuisine is the cuisine of Greek Americans and their descendants, who have modified Greek cuisine under the influence of American culture and immigration patterns of Greeks to the United States. As immigrants from various Greek areas settled in different regions of the United States and became "Greek Americans," they carried with them different traditions of foods and recipes that were particularly identified with their regional origins in Greece and yet infused with the characteristics of their new home locale in America. Many of these foods and recipes developed into new favorites for town peoples and then later for Americans nationwide. Greek-American cuisine is especially prominent in areas of concentrated Greek communities, such as Astoria, Queens and Tarpon Springs, Florida.

== Greek-American taverna ==
Saganaki, lit on fire, served in Chicago

The taverna and estiatorio are widespread in the major US cities, serving Greek-American cooking. A typical menu for a taverna would usually include many if not all of the following items:

- Bread, usually loaf bread, sometimes flat bread, used to make sandwiches such as the gyro;
- Salads, such as Greek salad;
- Appetizers or entrées like tzatziki (yogurt, garlic, cucumber dip), melitzanosalata (eggplant dip), tirokafteri (whipped feta cheese, with hot peppers and olive oil dip), spanakopita and dolmades or dolmadakia – (rice mixture with fresh herbs such as mint and parsley and sometimes pine nuts-and in some regions minced meat is added-tightly wrapped with tender grape leaves and served with a thick and creamy, lemony sauce)
- Soups like fasolada (bean soup)
- Pasta such as spaghetti napolitano; pastitsio baked layers of thick pasta (Greek pastitsio noodles) and minced meat mixture topped with a thick béchamel sauce)
- Gyro sandwich in pita bread or plated
- Fish and seafood dishes such as baked fresh fish, fried salt cod served with skordalia (garlic sauce); fried squid and baby octopus
- Baked dishes (magirefta) such as a wide variety of seasonal Vegetable dishes); moussaka (eggplant or zucchini, minced meat, béchamel sauce)
- Grilled dishes such as souvlaki
- Wine including retsina, mavrodafni and other Greek red/white wine varieties
- Beer
- Spirits such as ouzo, tsipouro and Metaxa brandy
- Fruit

== Areas with high concentration of Greek-American restaurants ==
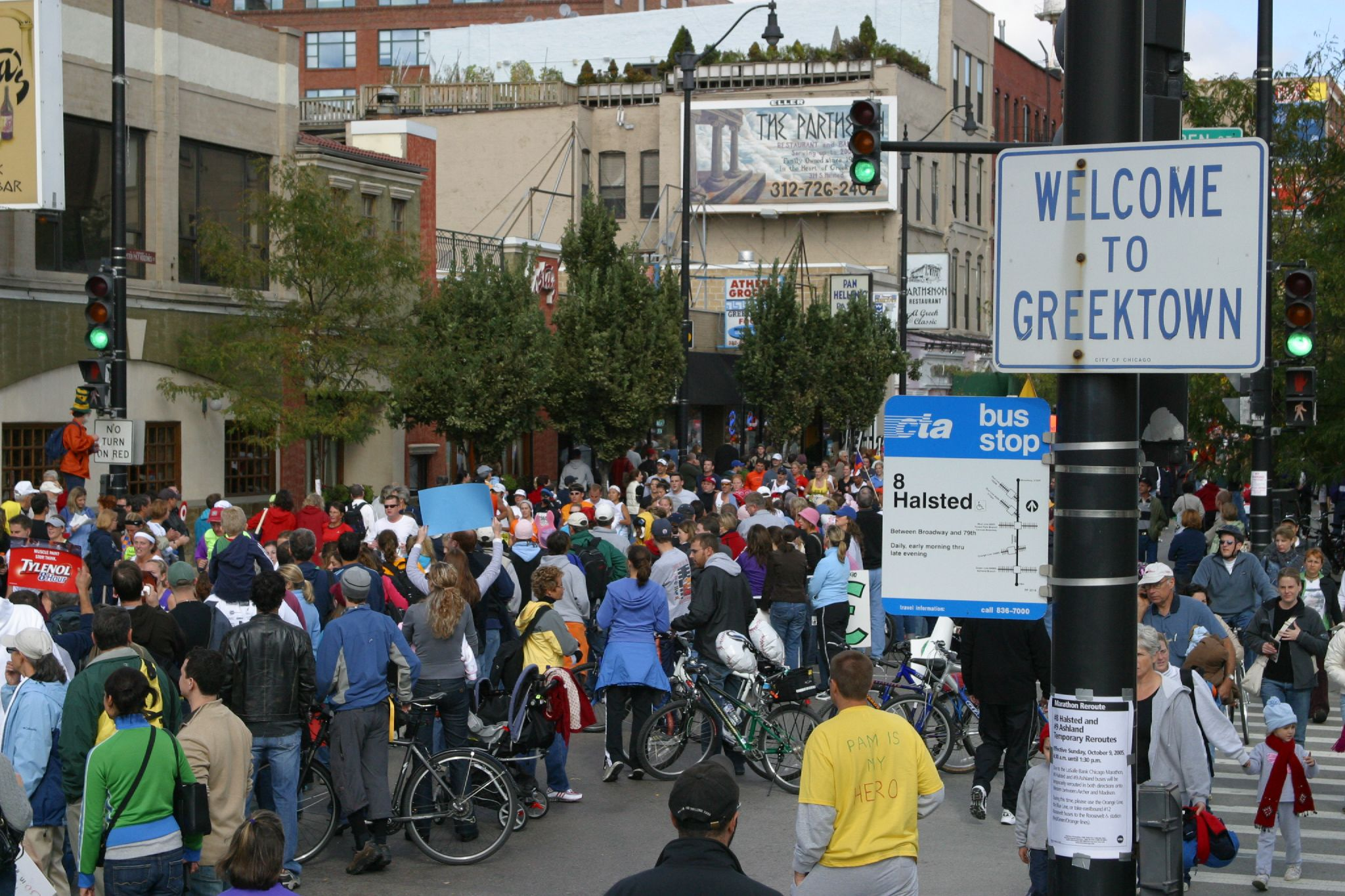
Restaurants at Greektown, Chicago

Various areas of the United States have hosted Greek-American cuisine with the most prominent examples being Astoria, Queens, in New York City, Greektown, Chicago, Greektown Historic District in Detroit, Tarpon Springs, Florida and Greektown, Baltimore. Greek-American cuisine spread to the western US with immigrants who tended to work mining, smelting, and railroading towns in the region. In Salt Lake City Greek-American cuisine is a common part of the menu at fast-food restaurants such as Crown Burgers.

== Contributions ==
Greek Americans have contributed a lot to American cuisine and many of its recipes. For example, Greek immigrants invented the Coney Island hot dog. The first and most notable Coney Island hot dog restaurant, the American Coney Island, was founded in 1917 by Greek immigrant Constantine "Gust" Keros. Gust brought his brother over from Greece and helped him open the Lafayette Coney Island restaurant next door. Additionally, in 1949, Greek immigrant, Nicholas Lambrinides, started Skyline Chili, which popularized Cincinnati chili, a culinary descendant of the Greek dish pastitsio.

== See also ==
- Greek cuisine
- Cuisine of the United States
- North American cuisine
- New American cuisine
- Mediterranean cuisine
- Cincinnati chili, a dish indigenous to the Cincinnati area and strongly influenced by Greek cuisine
