= Dixie Chili and Deli =

Restaurant chain in the U.S. state of Kentucky

- Company type: Private chain
- Industry: Restaurant
- Founded: 1929 in Newport, Kentucky, USA
- Headquarters: 733 Monmouth Street, Newport, Kentucky 41071
- Key people: Spiros Sarakatsannis, CEO; Nicholas Sarakatsannis, Founder
- Products: Cincinnati chili, deli
- Website: www.dixiechili.com

Dixie Chili and Deli, originally Dixie Chili, is a chain of three Cincinnati chili restaurants located in the Northern Kentucky area of Greater Cincinnati. Dixie Chili is famous for their chili, coneys, and sandwiches. Greek immigrant Nicholas Sarakatsannis founded the first location in 1929 in Newport, Kentucky, just across the Ohio River from the city of Cincinnati. Today the company also has locations in Erlanger and Covington, additionally distributing a canned version of their chili product in supermarkets in the Cincinnati and Kentucky area, as well as in some Kroger stores in the Dayton, Ohio area.

== History ==
Nicholas Sarakatsannis immigrated to the United States from Greece in 1912 at the age of 15 in order to escape hostilities between the Greeks and the Turks. He landed a series of jobs in restaurants and the food industry, eventually arriving in Cincinnati. In 1928, he began working for Empress Chili, the original Cincinnati-style chili parlor. His first day on the job he made nine gallons of chili.

He soon became convinced he could develop his own recipe and open his own chili parlor. Searching the region on buses between split shifts for a location that would not be in competition with Empress, Sarakatsannis found a location in Newport, Kentucky on Monmouth Street, the city's primary business district. The first Dixie Chili restaurant opened its doors in 1929, the year the Great Depression began in the United States and is still a family-owned company.

== See also ==
- Skyline Chili
- Gold Star Chili
- Camp Washington Chili
- List of delicatessens
