= Bulgarian Americans =

Bulgarian Americans Американски българи

Total population
- 100,557 (2019 Census); 250,000 +30,000 students General assessments of Bulgarian diplomatic representations in the US (2010)

Regions with significant populations
- California, with smaller communities in Ohio, Indiana, Illinois, New York, New Jersey, Georgia, Pennsylvania, Missouri, Michigan, Colorado, Utah, Nevada, Minnesota, Nebraska, Texas, and Washington

Languages
- Bulgarian, American English

Religion
- Predominantly Orthodox Christianity; Minority Islam (mainly Pomaks), Judaism

Related ethnic groups
- Bulgarian Australians, Bulgarian Canadians, Bulgarian New Zealanders, Bulgarians in South America, Macedonian Americans, Serbian Americans

A lodging house filled with Bulgarian immigrants in Chicago 1910

Bulgarian Americans are Americans of full or partial Bulgarian descent.

For the 2000 United States census, 55,489 Americans indicated Bulgarian as their first ancestry, while 92,841 persons declared to have Bulgarian ancestry. Those can include Bulgarian Americans living in the United States for one or several generations, dual Bulgarian American citizens, or any other Bulgarian Americans who consider themselves to be affiliated to both cultures or countries.

Bulgarian Americans include persons born in Bulgaria, in the United States, and in other countries with ethnic Bulgarian population. Because some Bulgarians are not American citizens, others are dual citizens, and still others' ancestors moved to the U.S. several generations ago, some of these people consider themselves to be simply Americans, Bulgarians, Bulgarians living in the United States or American Bulgarians.

After the 2000 U.S. census, the population grew significantly — according to the general assessments of Bulgarian diplomatic representations in the US for 2010, there were 250,000 Bulgarians residing in the country, and more than 30,000 students.

== History ==
Bulgarian immigration to the United States began in the mid 19th century. According to Mihaela Robila they tended to settle in Slavic enclaves in the Midwest or Northeast. David Cassens has published a study of 'The Bulgarian Colony of Southwestern Illinois 1900-1920'. To Chicago and Back, (Bulgarian:"До Чикаго и назад") by the eminent Bulgarian author Aleko Konstantinov; first published in 1894 mostly concerns attendance at a trade fair, not emigration per se. Initially a large portion of early bulgarian immigrants were protestant converts from Ottoman Bulgaria. The first major immigration wave began between 1903 and 1910. During this time many Bulgarians especially from Macedonia, immigrated primarily for better economic opportunities in the United States. In addition many of the immigrants from Macedonia a majority of which consider themselves to be Macedonian Americans today, immigrated after the brutal suppression of the Ilinden–Preobrazhenie Uprising in 1903. Immigration from Bulgaria was reduced after the passing of the National Origins Immigration Act in 1924.

Immigration from Bulgaria started off again after the establishment of communism in 1945. Many political dissidents and refugees would end up in the United States via Western Europe thanks to Displaced Persons Act.

Immigration remained relatively slow until the fall of communism in 1989 and the deterioration of the economic situation in Bulgaria which caused thousands of people per year to begin immigrating to western countries such as the U.S.

The United States has one of the highest numbers of Bulgarians of any country in the world. As many as 250,000^{1} Bulgarians live in the country. From the Eastern European countries, Bulgaria has the second highest number of students who study in the United States, after Russia.

Resolution 291 is a bill introduce by representative Bradley Scott in 2025 to make March, Bulgarian-American Heritage Month

== Demographics ==
The state with the largest number of Bulgarians is Illinois, followed by California, New York, New Jersey, Florida, Ohio, and Indiana. Texas, more specifically Houston, also has a growing population. According to the 2000 US census the cities with the highest number of Bulgarian Americans are New York, Los Angeles, Chicago and Miami. Approximately 60% of Bulgarian Americans over the age of 25 hold a bachelor's degree or higher. In 2015, out of 61,377 ethnic Bulgarians born outside the United States, 57,089 were born in Bulgaria, 37 in North Macedonia and 46 in Greece.

Bulgarian Americans have an annual median household income of $76,862. Following the 2000 US census when Bulgarians were 50–100,000, during the last 10 years their number has grown significantly to over 250,000.

=== Bulgarian-born population ===
Bulgarian-born population in the US since 2010:

Year	Number
2010	62,684
2011	▲65,202
2012	▼64,964
2013	▲67,941
2014	▼63,318
2015	▲67,377
2016	▲70,800

== Language ==
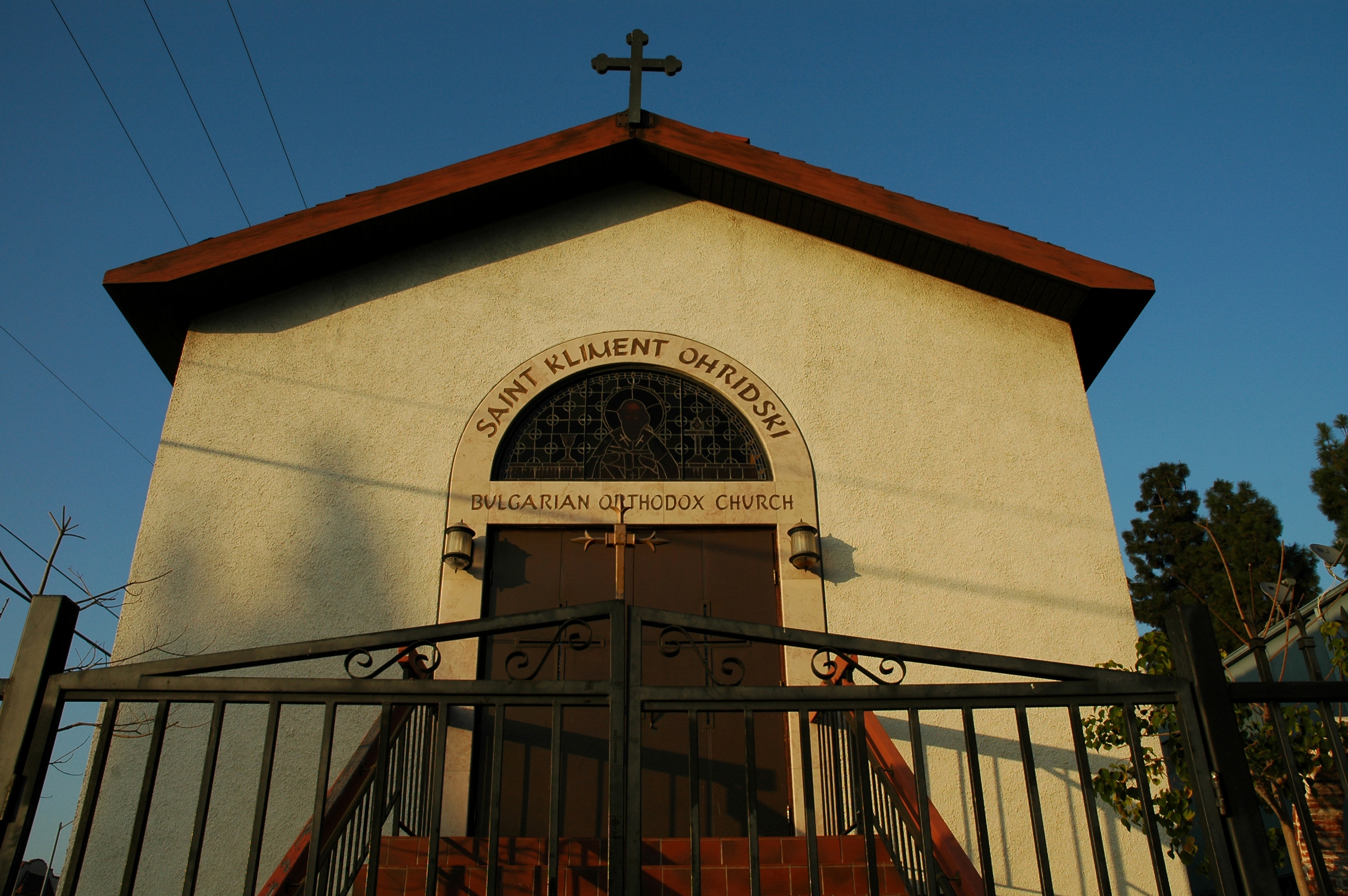
A Bulgarian church (Saint Climent of Ohrid) in Los Angeles, California

According to the 2000 US Census, 28,565 people indicated that they speak Bulgarian at home. But in the recent years the number grew significantly to over 250,000 people. Some Bulgarian Americans speak Bulgarian, especially the more recent immigrants, while others might not speak the language at all, or speak Bulgarian mixed with English to a lesser or greater extent.

Some Bulgarian Americans understand Bulgarian even though they might not be able to speak the language. There are cases where older generations of Bulgarians or descendants of Bulgarian immigrants from the early part of the 20th century are fluent in the Bulgarian language as well.

== Notable people ==
- John Vincent Atanasoff (1903–1995) – inventor of the first automatic electronic digital computer
- Miroslav Barnyashev – professional wrestler who worked as "Rusev"
- Christo – world-famous artist known for projects such as The Gates and The Wrapped Reichstag
- Carolyn Christov-Bakargiev – writer, art historian, and curator
- Stoyan Christowe – author, journalist and Vermont political figure
- Steven Derounian (1918–2007) – U.S. representative from New York
- Kiradjieff brothers, creators of Cincinnati chili
- Stephane Groueff (1922–2006) – writer and journalist who wrote the book Manhattan Project: The Untold Story of the Making of the Atomic Bomb
- Assen Jordanoff (1896–1967) – aviation constructor with a global recognition
- George Kliavkoff – former lawyer, business executive, and former commissioner of the Pac-12 Conference.
- Dan Kolov (1892–1940) – early 20th century wrestler
- Ted Kotcheff – film and television director and producer (First Blood, Weekend at Bernie's)
- Leah LaBelle (1986–2018) – singer and finalist on American Idol
- Alex Maleev – comic book illustrator and artist best known for the Marvel Comics' series Daredevil (vol. 2), collaborating with writer Brian Michael Bendis
- Martin P. Mintchev – engineering professor
- Angela Nikodinov – figure skater
- Victor Ninov – nuclear physicist
- Peter Petroff (1919–2003) – inventor, engineer, NASA scientist, and adventurer
- Maria Popova – writer, critic, and blogger; named among the "100 Most Creative People in Business" by Fast Company in 2012
- Svetla Protich – classical pianist
- Vladimir Tenev – billionaire, co-founder of companies in different sectors, entrepreneur
- Andre Roussimoff (1946–1993) – professional wrestler known as André the Giant
- Dimitar Sasselov – astronomer and professor at Harvard University
- Kyril Vassilev (1908–1987) – portrait painter of royalty and American society during the mid-20th century
- Sam Voinoff (1907–1989) – college golf coach at Purdue University, with 10 Big Ten, and 1 NCAA championships.
- Sophia Popov – professional golfer, of Bulgarian and German ancestry
- Pete George – weightlifter and Olympic and World champion
- Jim George – weightlifter
- Ralitsa Vassileva - former anchor at CNN from 1992 to 2014, now university teacher at Grady College of Journalism and Mass Communication

== See also ==
- Bulgarian Eastern Orthodox Diocese of the USA, Canada and Australia
- European Americans
- Macedonian Patriotic Organization
- St. John of Rila Church (Chicago)
- Bulgaria–United States relations

== Notes ==
Estimates of the Agency for Bulgarians Abroad for the numbers of ethnic Bulgarians living for the country in question based on data from the Bulgarian Border Police, the Bulgarian Ministry of Labour and reports from immigrant associations. The numbers include members of the diaspora (2nd and 3rd generation descendants of Bulgarian immigrants), legal immigrants, illegal immigrants, students and other individuals permanently residing in the country in question as of 2004.
