= Camp Washington Chili =

Restaurant in Ohio, United States

Coordinates: 39°8′15.21″N 84°32′16.02″W

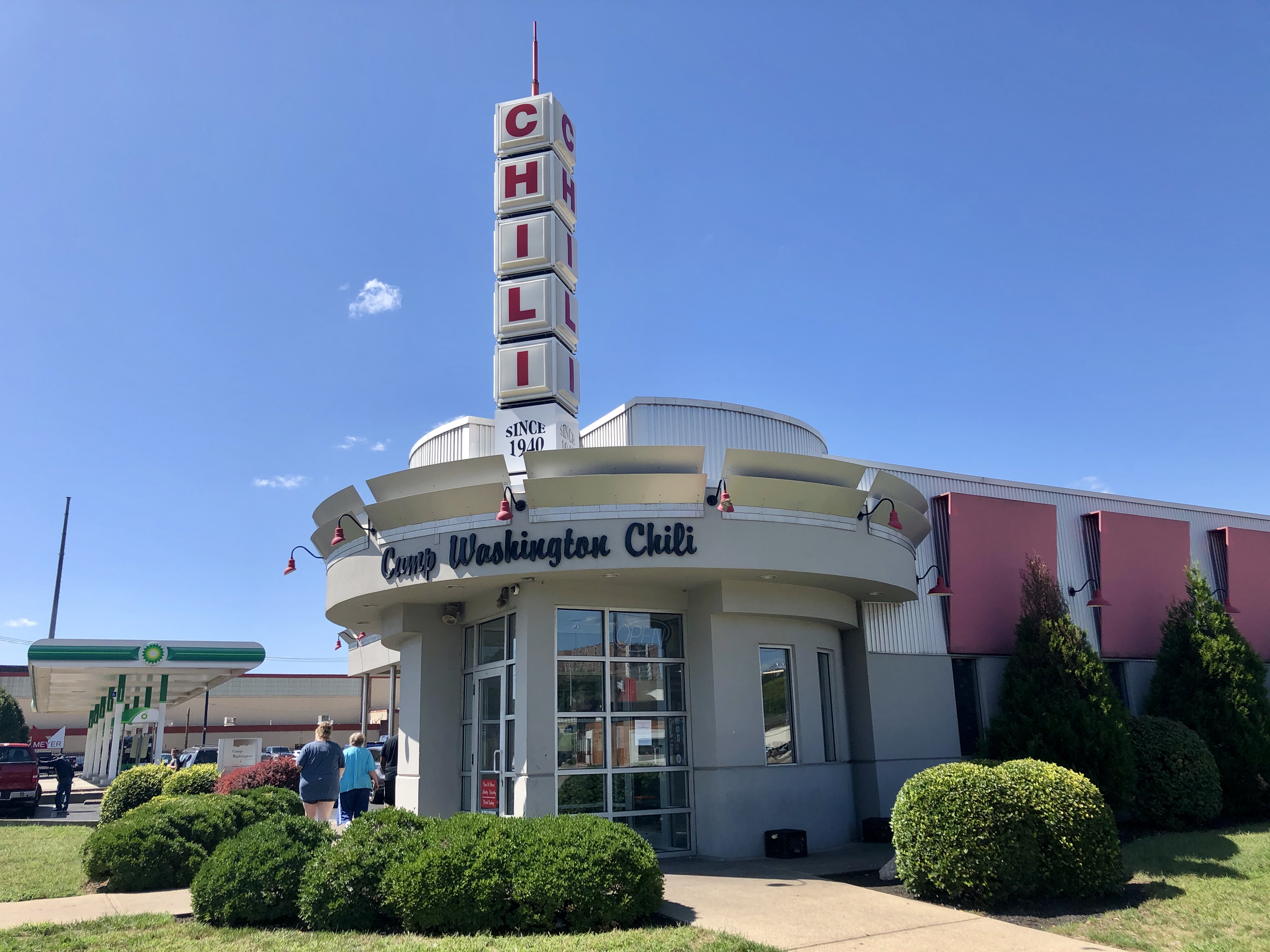
- Exterior of Camp Washington Chili in 2019
- Interactive map of Camp Washington Chili

Restaurant information
- Owner: John Johnson
- Previous owners: Steve Andon and Fred Zannbu
- Food type: American
- Location: 3005 Colerain Ave, Cincinnati, Hamilton, Ohio, 45225, USA
- Website: campwashingtonchili.com

Camp Washington Chili is a Cincinnati chili parlor founded in 1940 by Steve Andon and Fred Zarnbus in the neighborhood of Camp Washington, near downtown Cincinnati, in southwestern Ohio. A well known Cincinnati landmark, the parlor is located at 3005 Colerain Avenue, and was run by longtime owner John Johnson until his death in October 2025. It is now run by his daughter, Maria Papakirk The restaurant left its old location and moved to a site a few lots away in 2000, after being told to vacate by the city in order to widen Hopple Street. Their new location is modeled after a 1950s-style diner. The restaurant is open 24 hours a day every day but Sunday.

In 2011, Camp Washington Chili was featured on a Cincinnati episode of the Travel Channel's Man v. Food Nation.

== Reception ==
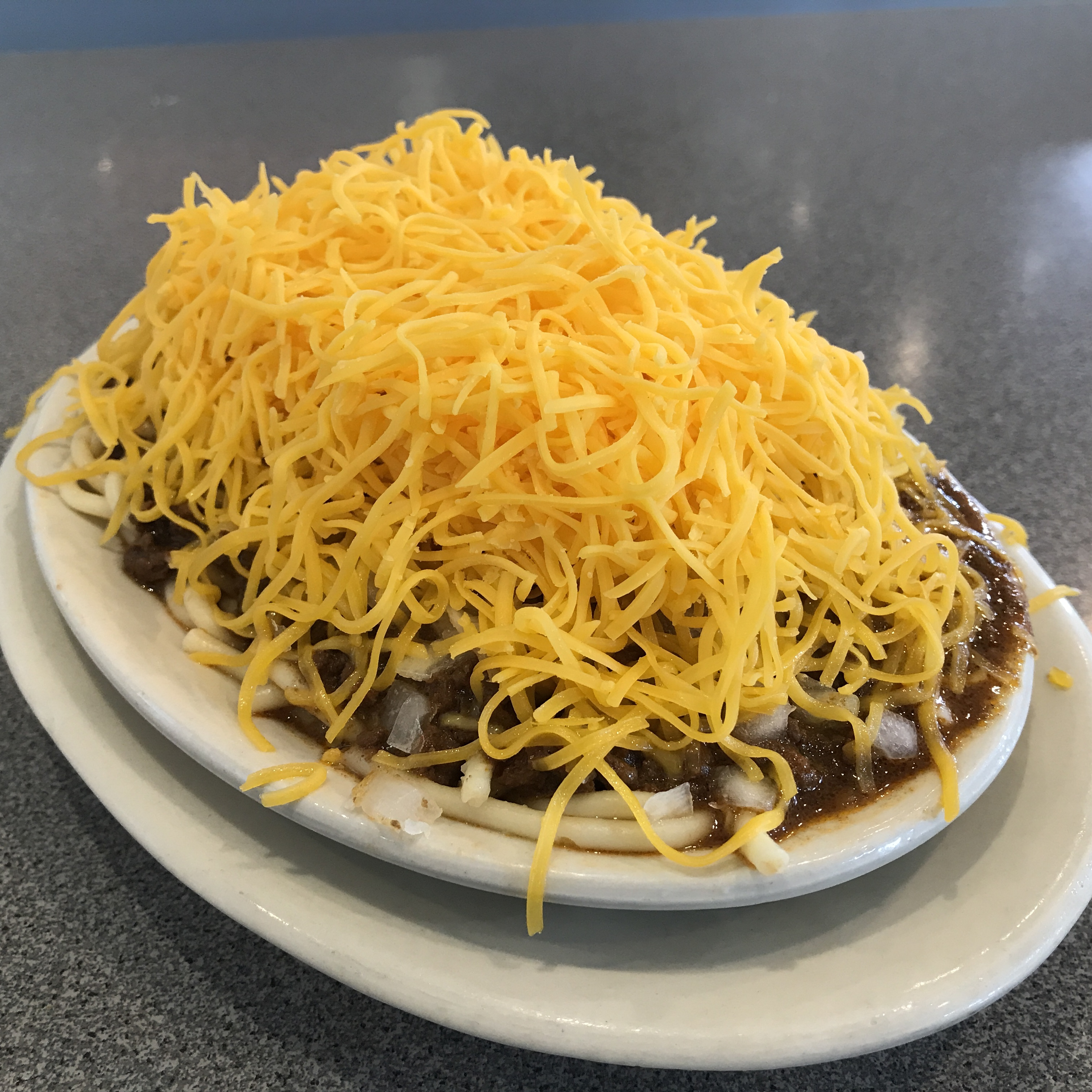
4-way Cincinnati chili from Camp Washington Chili

In 2009, food writers Jane and Michael Stern wrote of Camp Washington Chili that "when we crave the best, there is just one place to go." In a New York Times interview, the Sterns declared it the best maker of Cincinnati five-way chili. In 2014, Travel + Leisure named it one of "America's Best Chili(s)". Bon Appétit named it one of "The Best Chili Spots." In 2000, the chili served by the restaurant won an "American Regional Classic" James Beard Foundation Award. CBS News in 1985 named it "the best chili in the nation." The restaurant has been featured by HGTV, the Huffington Post, Forbes, and Every Day with Rachael Ray.

== In popular culture ==
Blues musician Lonnie Mack wrote a song entitled "Camp Washington Chili".

== See also ==
- Skyline Chili
- Gold Star Chili
- Dixie Chili and Deli
- Cincinnati cuisine
