= Kiradjieff brothers =

American restaurateurs

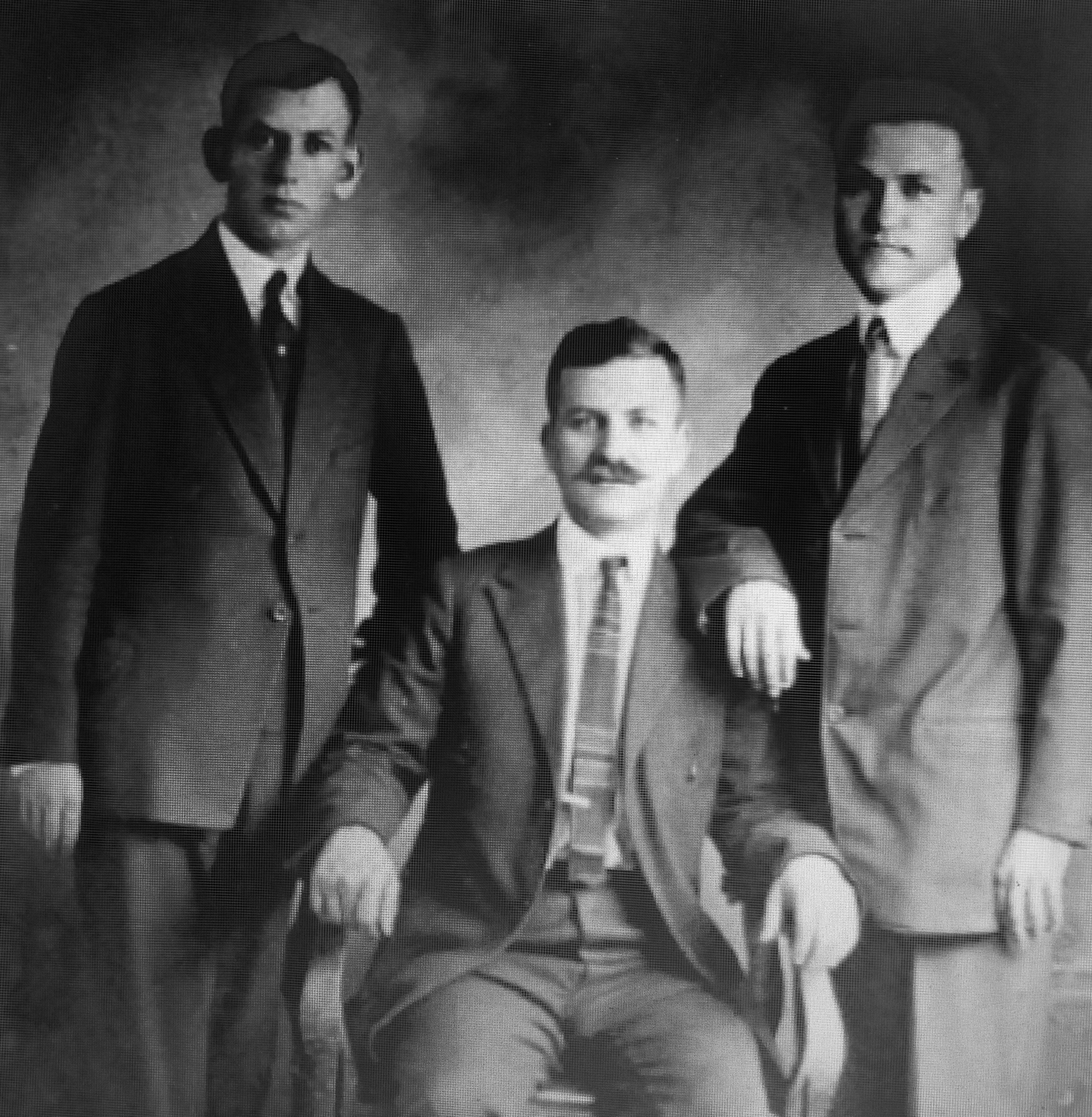
Kiradjieff brothers in Cincinnati, 1921. From left to right: Athanas, Argir and Ivan. (Note: This photo of the Kiradjieff brothers dated May 29, 1921, was taken at Maly's Studio on 635 Vine Street.)

Tom Kiradjieff and John Kiradjieff were Bulgarian American restaurateurs and Macedonian immigrants, credited for their creation of a regional specialty dish known as Cincinnati chili.

== History ==
The brothers were born in the town of Hrupishta, in the Ottoman Empire, (Note: According to the statistics of Vasil Kanchov ("Macedonia. Ethnography and Statistics"), in 1900 the Ottoman Hrupishta had 2690 inhabitants, of which there were 1100 Bulgarians, 700 Turks, 720 Aromanians and 170 Gypsies.) to Bulgarian parents. Their father Kostadin was a member of the Internal Macedonian Revolutionary Organization, and actively participated in the affairs of the Bulgarian Exarchate. (Note: According to IMARO revolutionaries Georgi Hristov (1876-1964) and Kiryak Shkurtov, the father of the Kiradjhieff brothers Kostadin, was among the leading members of the Bulgarian community in the town.) The town was annexed during the Balkan Wars (1912-1913) by Greece. The partition of the Ottoman lands of the region of Macedonia between the Balkan nation-states resulted in the fact that some of the Slavic speakers of Ottoman Macedonia emigrated to Bulgaria, or left the area.

Athanas (Tom) was born in 1892. During the First World War, he was a soldier in the Bulgarian Army. In 1917, he was dismissed and moved to the Bulgarian capital Sofia, where he worked for a time as an accountant. His little brother, Ivan (John), born in 1895, had served also some time with the Bulgarian army. In 1921, both emigrated to the United States.

They settled initially in New York, but after selling hot dogs there for some time, the brothers followed their big brother Argir (Argie) to Cincinnati. (Note: In a petition to the US Congress opened on May 21, 2022 by Ivan D. Ivanov, Ph.D. in political science at the University of Cincinnati is available data from the 1920 US census. There is attached a sheet from the census' results, presenting Argir Kiradjieff as a Bulgarian from Macedonia living in Cincinnati. For more see: Stop H.R. 741 which misrepresents Macedono-Bulgarian Americans, p. 11, row 66.) Born in 1880, he was a cashier of the Bulgarian Exarchate Church-School Board in Hrupishta. Argie had settled in Cincinnati by 1918, where he opened a grocery store. In Cincinnati, the brothers began to develop their own business. Tom got a job as a bank clerk and worked at night, cooking chili for the customers in his brother's place. It was at this time that Tom invented the regional specialty known as Cincinnati chili.

In 1922, they opened a hot dog stand located next to a burlesque theater called the Empress, which they named their business after. Tom and John returned to Bulgaria to find wives, while Argir went to his homeland for this purpose. Argir stayed there for several years, and when he came back, his two brothers were well established and provided him a job as a cashier. According to the journalist Vasil Stephanoff, (Note: Vasil Stephanoff (1884 – 1950) was a Bulgarian publicist, publisher of the newspaper Naroden Glas (1907 – 1950) in the US. For more: MCHS News, November 2015, Vol. 3, Issue No. 6, An article on Vasil Stephanoff, p. 6.) in 1933 the Kiradjieff brothers were among the most successful Bulgarians in the city, owners of a large and modern restaurant in the city center.

Argir's wife did not adapt to America, and they moved back to Macedonia in the 1940s. (Note: It is not clear when exactly they moved back and which country was their destination. In 1940, this region's northern parts belonged to the Kingdom of Yugoslavia, while the southern parts belonged to the Kingdom of Greece. Between 1941 and 1944 the Yugoslav area and some parts of Greek Macedonia were annexed by the Kingdom of Bulgaria. In 1945 the northern part became a new Yugoslav Republic, while in the southern part broke out the Greek Civil War. The northeastern part remained under Bulgaria during the whole period.) Empress Chili grew to become a local chain. In 1959, the Kiradjieffs of Empress Chili announced that they would be the first to come up with a new design for drive in car-service. The last man who ran the family business was Tom's son, Assen (Joe) Kiradjieff (1930-2024). Since the late 1950s, when his father's health sharply declined, Joe operated Empress Chili. Tom died in 1960, while John had died in 1953. Later, the Empress chain had a single surviving outlet. In 2009, 79-year-old Joe retired and sold Empress Chili.

== Gallery ==
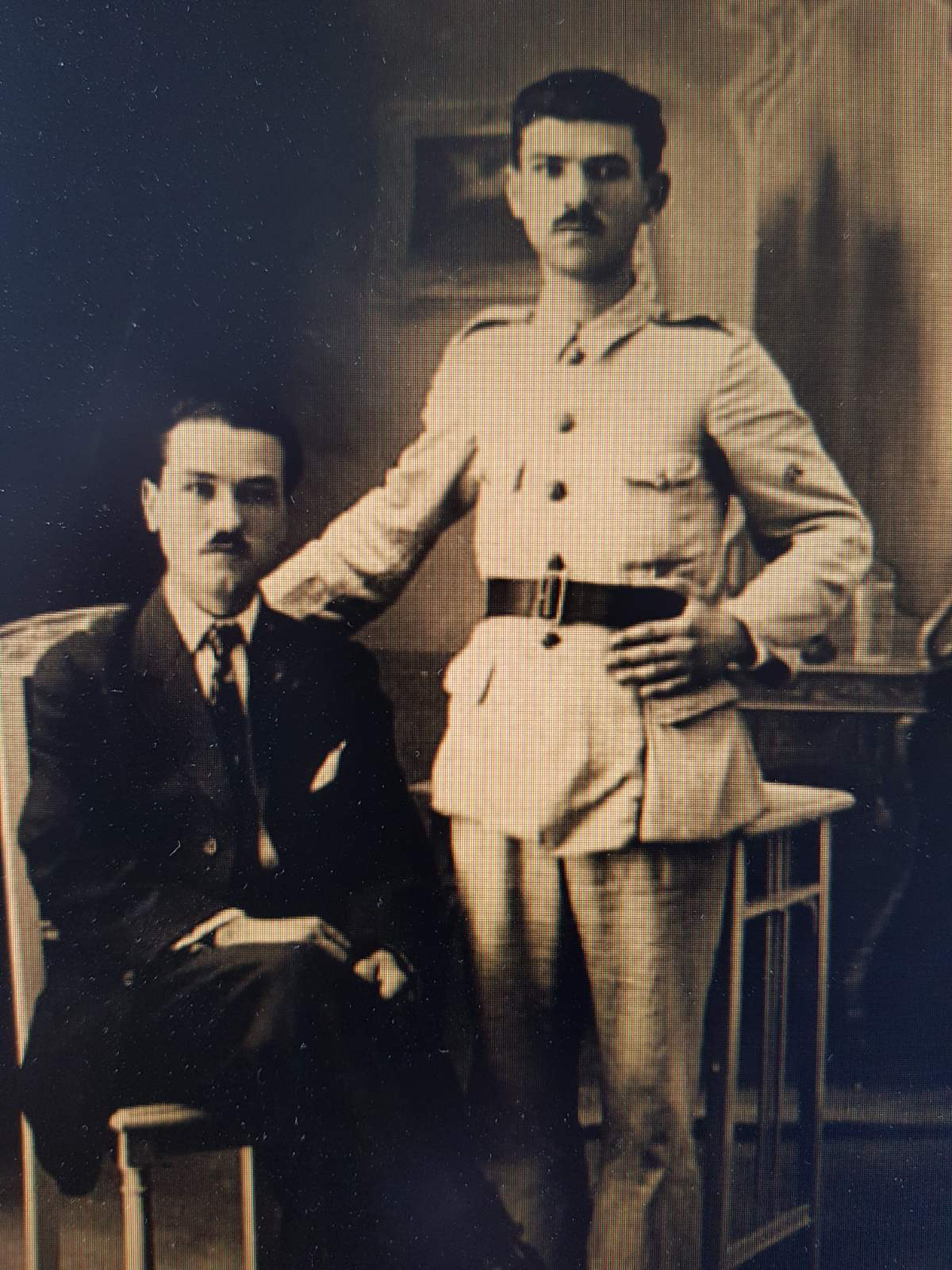
Ivan Kiradjieff and his little brother Ilia in Bulgarian military uniform.

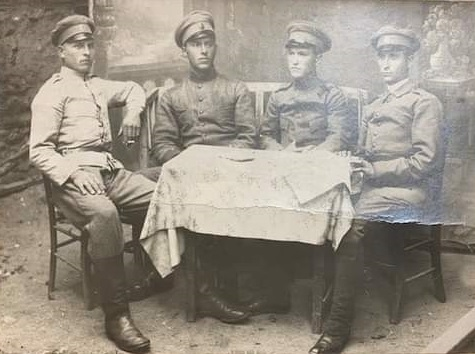
Bulgarian soldiers during WWI. Ivan Kiradjieff is third from left.

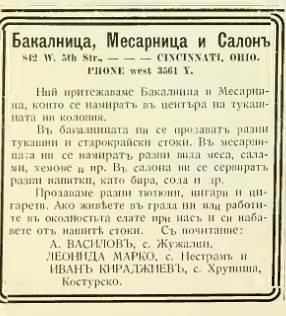
Advertising from Bulgarian-American Almanac for 1922. One of the signed partners is Ivan Kiradjieff.

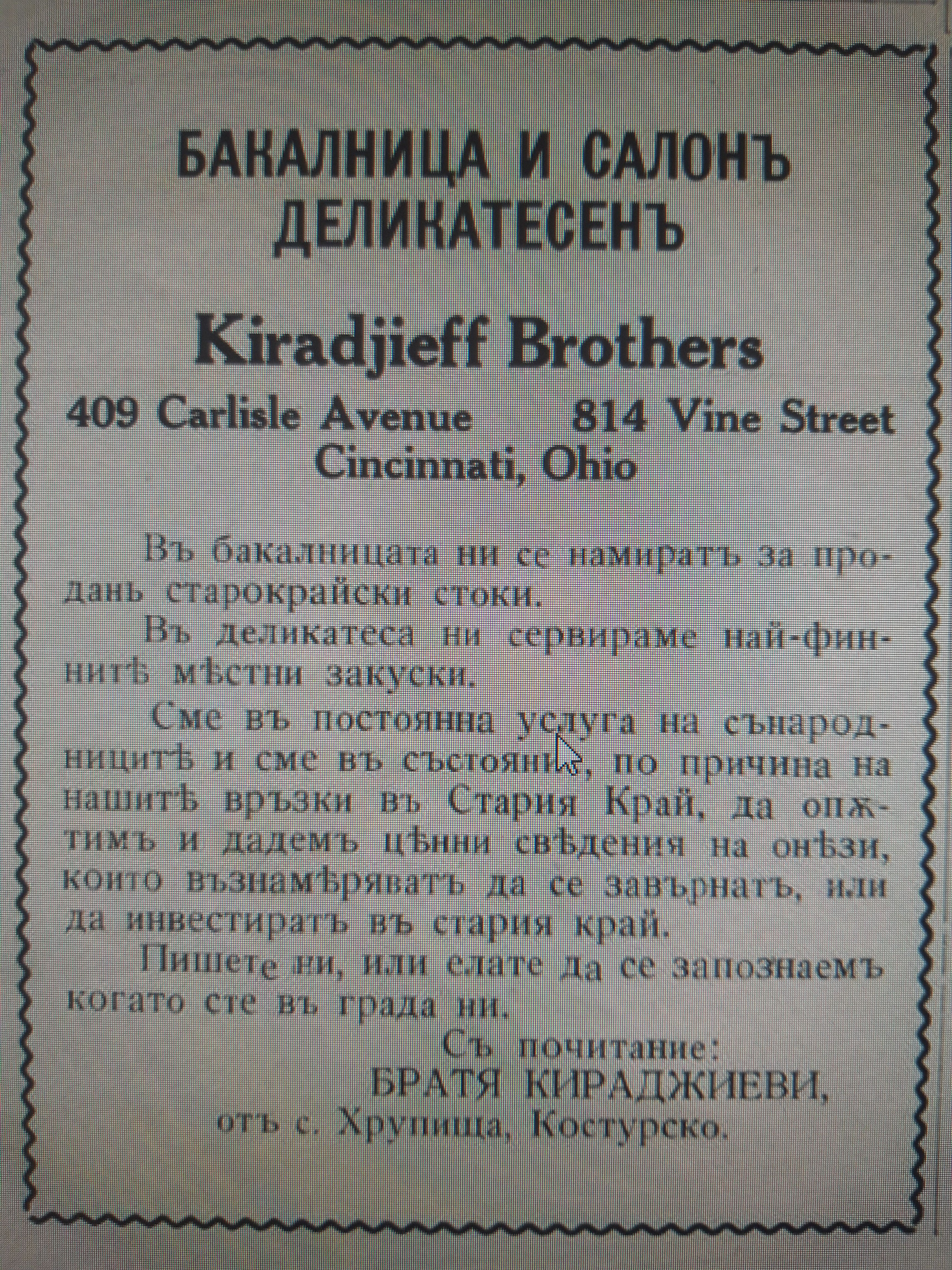
Advertising from Kiradjieff Bros. published in Bulgarian-American Almanac for 1924.

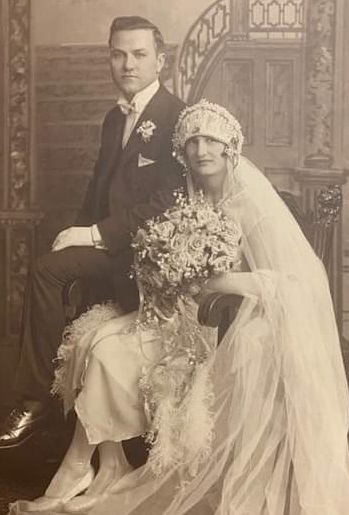
Ivan Kiradjieff and his Bulgarian wife Mila Gandeva in Paris.

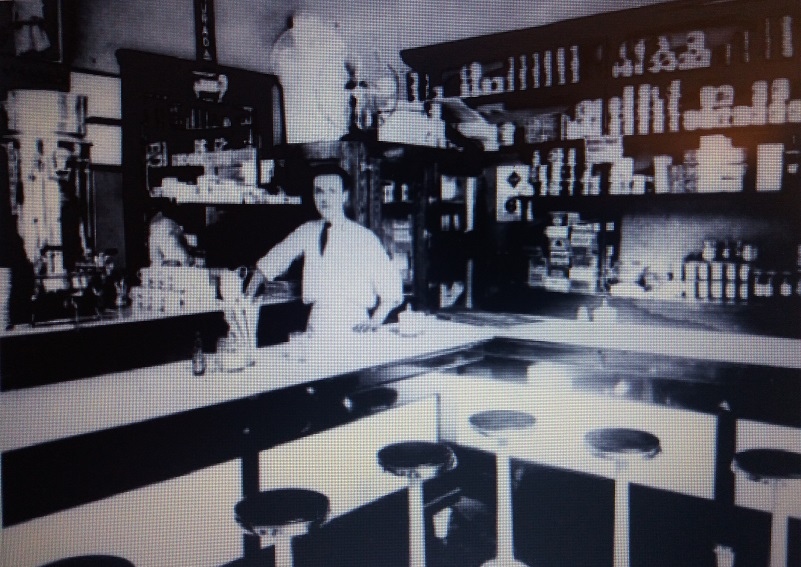
Ivan Kiradjieff posing in Empress Chili in Cincinnati.

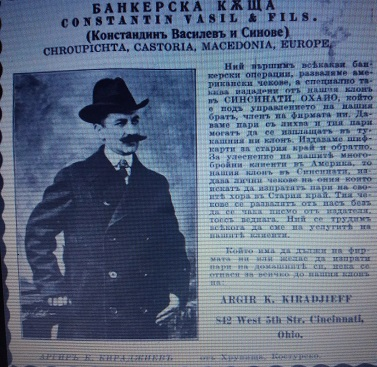
Advertisement with Argir Kiradjieff published in Bulgarian newspaper Naroden Glas. (Note: Naroden Glas was a Bulgarian newspaper, an agency of the Macedonian Bulgarian emigrants to the United States. It was published in Bulgarian in the period from 1907 to 1950 in Granite City. See: Naroden Glas = National Herald (Granite City, Ill.) 1907-195? on the site of the Library of Congress.)

== See also ==
- Slavic speakers of Greek Macedonia
- Macedonian Bulgarians
- Macedonian Americans
