= Federal Computer Week =

Nextgov/FCW (launched as Federal Computer Week and later rebranded FCW) is a news website that covers U.S. federal government technology and occasionally state, local, tribal and international governments. It is owned by GovExec.

Federal Computer Week was established in 1987 by International Data Group as a weekly print magazine headquartered in Vienna, Virginia. By 2003, it was part of FCW Media Group.

Its ownership passed to California-based 1105 Government Information Group, a privately held company backed by two private equity firms: Nautic Partners and Alta Communications. Editor Christopher Dorobek resigned in August 2008 to accept a position at WFED. In December 2008, David Rapp, formerly an executive with Congressional Quarterly, became the publication's new editor (and editorial director overseeing all 1105 GovInfo publications).

In 2021, 1105 sold FCW and several sister publications to GovExec, whose NextGov publication competed with FCW. In 2023, GovExec merged FCW and NextGov, creating NextGov/FCW.
