= Chili John's =

Restaurant in Burbank, California

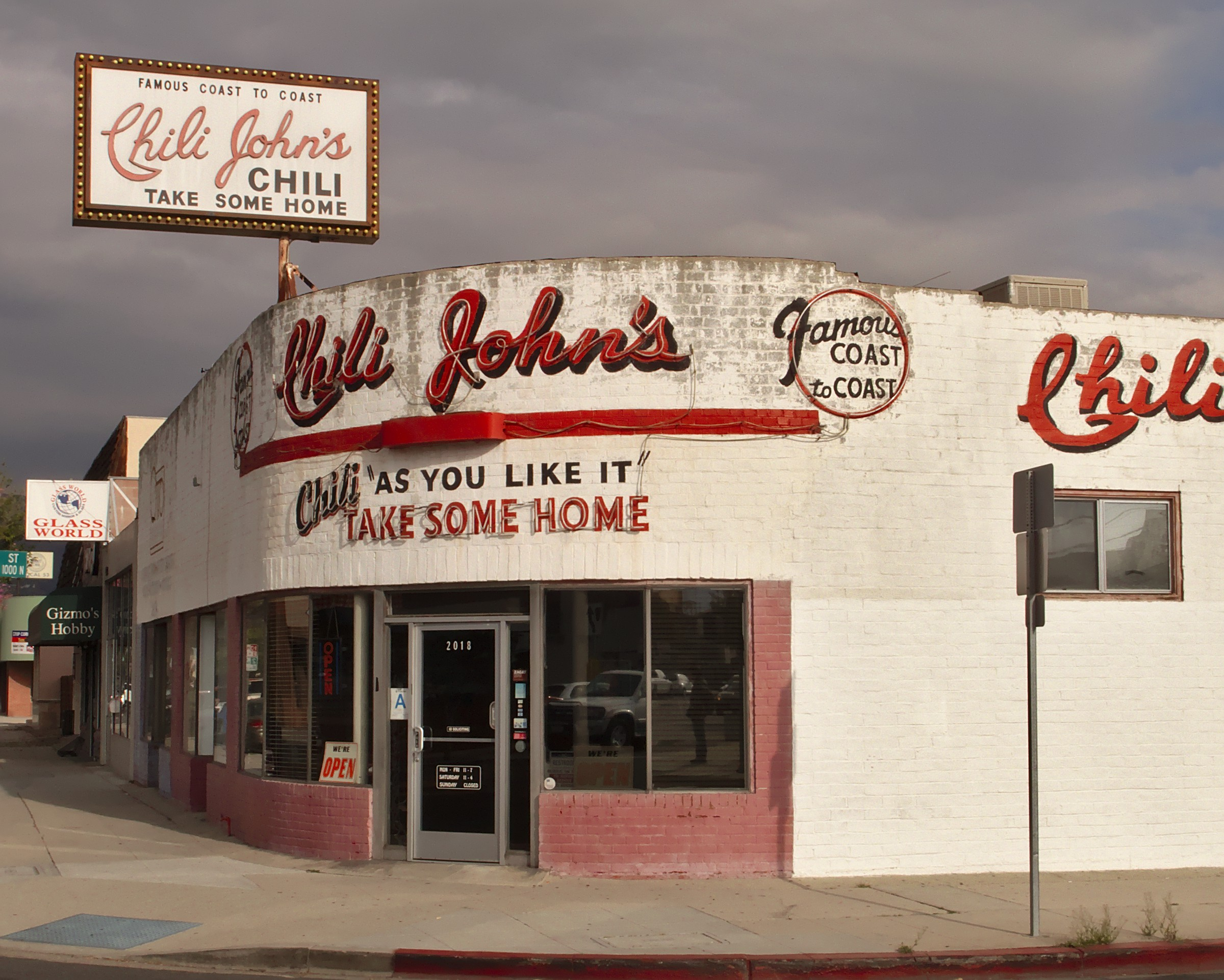
- Chili John's in Burbank, California
- Interactive map of Chili John's

Restaurant information
- Established: 1913 (Green Bay); 1946 (Burbank)
- Owner: Loguercio family
- Previous owner(s): John Isaac; Ernie Isaac; Gene Loguercio
- Food type: Chili parlor (Southwestern chili; often served over spaghetti)
- Location: Burbank, Los Angeles County, California, United States
- Coordinates: 34°10′48″N 118°20′1″W

Chili John's is a restaurant that originated in Green Bay, Wisconsin, opening in 1913. A second restaurant was opened in Burbank, California, in 1946. The Burbank location, which remains the only operating branch, has become a local landmark recognised for its distinctive U-shaped counter, mountain lake mural, and long-standing chili recipe dating back to the early 1900s. The restaurant has appeared in numerous films and television series and is the oldest continuously operating restaurant in Burbank.

== History ==
Lithuanian immigrant John Isaac began serving Southwestern chili at his Green Bay bar in 1900. Thirteen years later, the chili grew so popular that he renamed the establishment "Chili John's". The chili is most commonly served over spaghetti with oyster crackers and/or shredded cheese, though it can be ordered in a number of other ways as well.

His son Ernie moved to Los Angeles and launched Chili John's of California in 1946, installing the U-shaped counter and, since he was an avid fisherman, painted the mountain lake mural. For the past 20 years, the Loguercio family has owned Chili John's. The former owner Gene died in April 2009, and his wife Debbie has carried on with their sons Anthony and Alec.

The Green Bay location closed in 2020.

In 2025, Chili John’s faced renewed financial difficulties due to declining customer turnout and reduced film production activity in the Burbank area. To help sustain the restaurant, owners launched a fundraising campaign and opened an adjacent venue, the Taproom at Chili John’s, intending to attract new patrons and preserve the long-standing establishment.

== Media appearances ==
The location was used in the TV series I Am the Night Episode 3, The Rookie Season 1 - Episode 3, Big Love Season 2, Episode 8 (Kingdom Come), Mrs. Davis Season 1, Episode 6 (Allison Treasures: A Southern California Story),, Margo's Got Money Troubles Season 1, Episode 8, and in the films Once Upon a Time ... in Hollywood, Twin Peaks, and Star Trek.

In 2021, Chili John's was featured in the first episode of Restaurant Recovery, hosted by Todd Graves and featuring Snoop Dogg. The episode has Graves helping Chili John's come back from the "brink of collapse" as a result of the COVID-19 lockdowns in Southern California.

== See also ==
- Cincinnati chili, similar to this restaurant's signature dish, but developed independently
