= Skyline Chili =

Restaurant chain specializing in Cincinnati chili

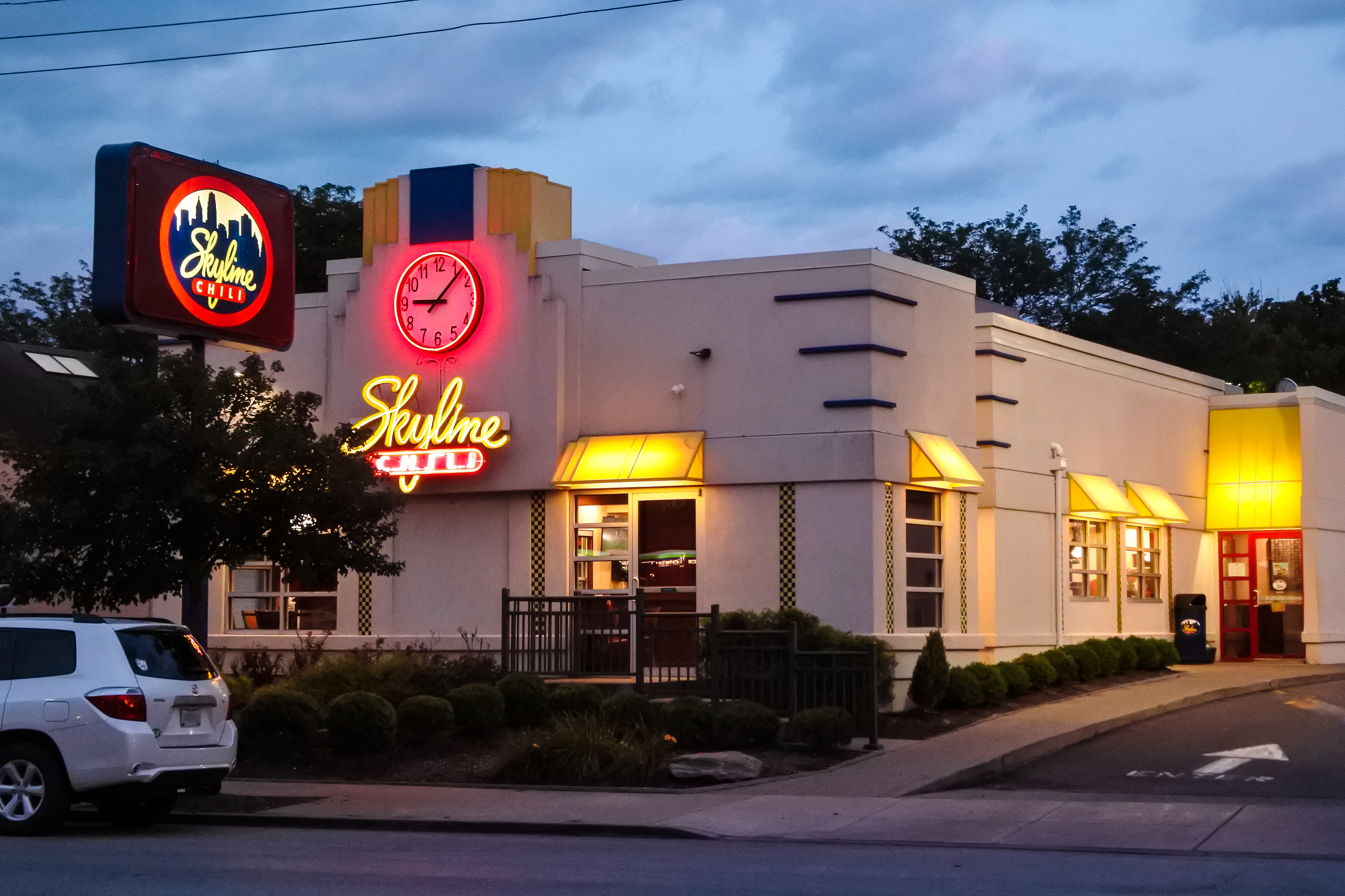
- Skyline Chili in Cincinnati, Ohio
- Type: Private
- Industry: Casual dining
- Founded: October 8, 1949; 77 years ago in Cincinnati, Ohio
- Founder: Nicholas Lambrinides
- Headquarters: Fairfield, Ohio, U.S.
- Number of locations: 160 (August 2021)
- Area served: Ohio, Kentucky, Indiana, Florida
- Key people: Kevin McDonnell, CEO
- Products: Cincinnati chili
- Website: www.skylinechili.com

Skyline Chili is a chain of Cincinnati-style chili restaurants based in Cincinnati, Ohio. Founded in 1949 by Greek immigrant Nicholas Lambrinides, Skyline Chili is named for the view of Cincinnati's skyline that Lambrinides could see from the first restaurant (which has since been demolished), opened in the section of town now known as Price Hill. It is also the "official chili" of many local professional sports teams and venues, including the Cincinnati Bengals, Cincinnati Reds, Cincinnati Cyclones, Columbus Blue Jackets and the Kings Island theme park, and also sponsors the Crosstown Shootout, an annual men's college basketball rivalry game between the city's two NCAA Division I teams, Cincinnati and Xavier.

== History ==
In 1912, Nicholas Lambrinides emigrated to Cincinnati from Kastoria, Greece, and brought his favorite family recipes with him. To save up the money to bring his wife to America as well, he first worked as a cook for a railroad crew and in a hotel kitchen, then opened a short-order diner. After nearly a decade, his wife was able to join him in Cincinnati and they raised five sons.

By World War II, Lambrinides was working as a chef for the original Empress Chili restaurant, where he continued to tinker with a recipe which he had been developing for years. In 1949, he and three of his sons opened their own place. That diner was located at 3822 Glenway Avenue, at the intersection of what is now Quebec and Glenway Avenue. While local lore says the name is from the view of the Cincinnati skyline seen in the original restaurant, the family claims it was inspired by a skylight and the view from a second floor storage unit over the restaurant. After some local resistance in the predominantly German Catholic neighborhood that observed meatless Fridays, Skyline developed a large and devoted following.

The family opened a second restaurant in 1953 and the growth of the business accelerated in the 1960s; by the end of the century, there were 110 Skyline restaurants, mostly in Ohio, but with additional establishments in other states including Kentucky, Indiana, and Florida. Lambrinides died in 1962 at the age of 82, but his sons continued to operate and expand the company. They have kept Nicholas's original recipe unchanged since then. According to William Lambrinides, "Dad always said, 'Don't change a thing with the recipe—don't add anything, don't take out anything, it's perfect the way it is'." As a result, Skyline's version has become nearly synonymous with Cincinnati chili. In 1998, the company was sold to Fleet Equity Partners, a New England investment firm, which promised not to change the recipe (which they reportedly keep locked in a safe).

In 2007, the company's board of directors purchased a majority of the Skyline stock previously owned by Chicago-based Prudential Capital Group.

== Menu ==
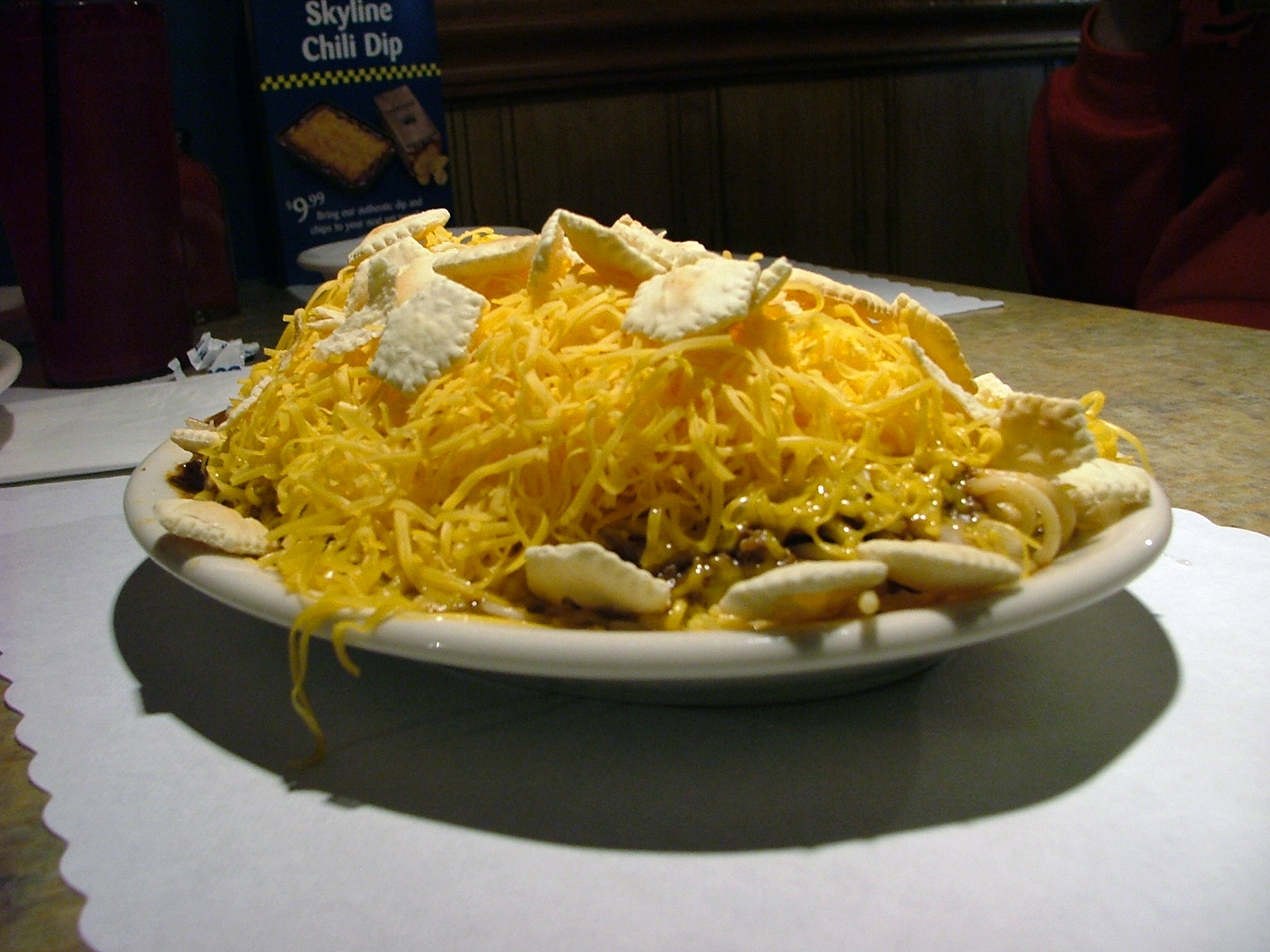
A 4-way with onions and oyster crackers

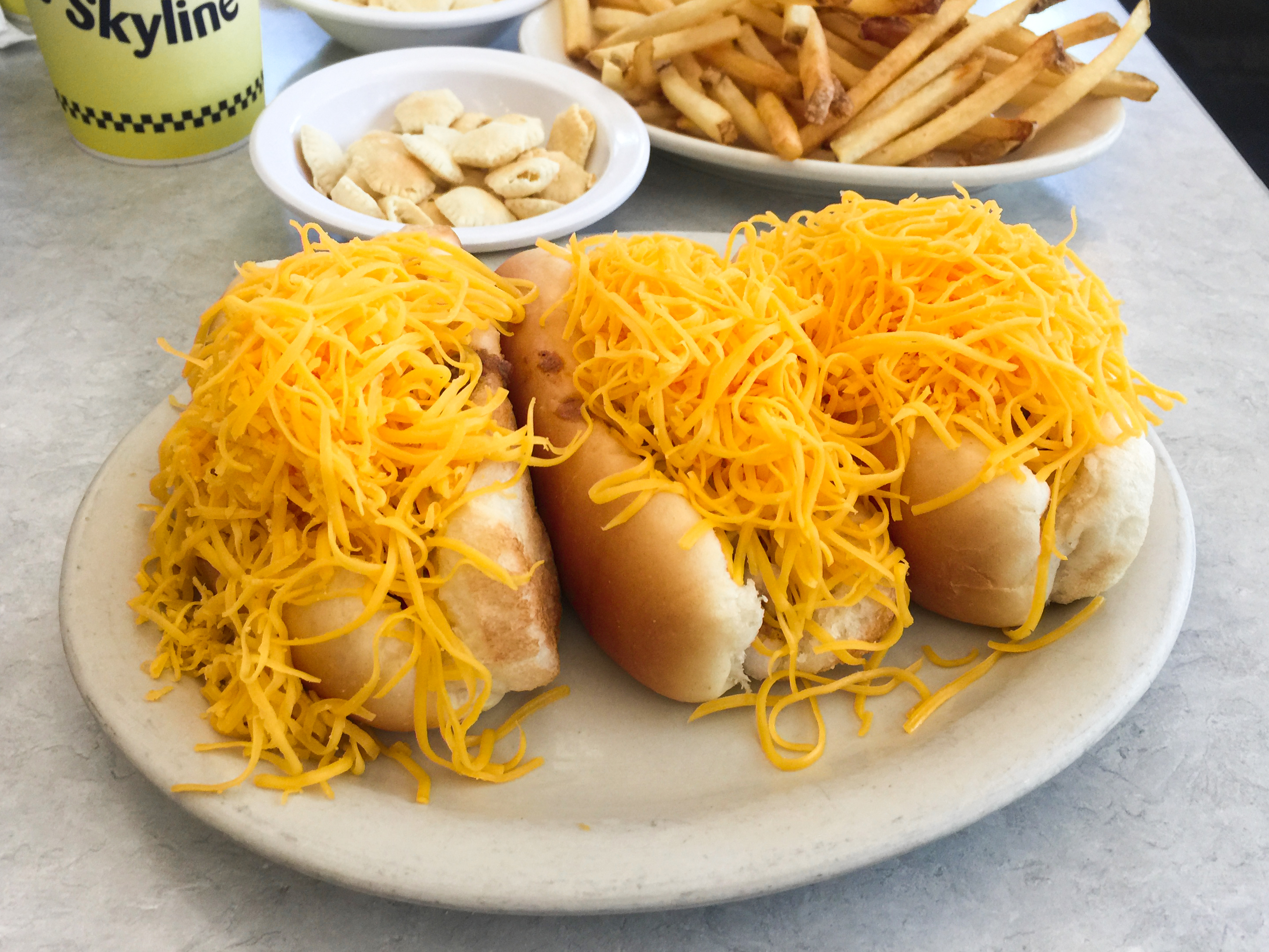
Cheese coneys with mustard and french fries

Skyline Chili is not chili con carne, the meat dish that originated in Mexico and is the state dish of Texas. Instead, Cincinnati chili is a sauce usually used over spaghetti or hot dogs, containing a unique spice blend that gives it a very distinct, sweet-and-savory taste. Officially, the recipe for Skyline Chili is a well-kept family secret among Lambrinides' surviving children, and the recipe is kept in a bank vault.

Skyline's menu includes their signature dishes: cheese coneys (a hot dog topped with Skyline Chili, mustard, onions, and cheese), and 3-ways (spaghetti topped with Skyline Chili and cheese); 4-ways (choice of beans or onions added), and 5-ways (beans and onions both added). Additional menu items are also purveyed. Skyline's chili, canned chili sauce and frozen microwave meals are also provided in supermarkets, notably at fellow Cincinnati-based Kroger.

In 2023 the location at Cincinnati/Northern Kentucky International Airport began offering breakfast items.

On March 18, 2024, Skyline announced it would be switching from Pepsi to Coca-Cola products as part of its 75th anniversary; Skyline had served Coca-Cola when the chain first opened in 1949. The announcement was met with mixed reaction on social media, with many fans lamenting the loss of Mountain Dew being available with Skyline, though the chain will have Mello Yello available as an option. The decision did not affect the company's offering of Dr Pepper or Skyline's signature tea offerings. Rival Gold Star Chili, which unlike Skyline had a longer-term relationship serving Pepsi, announced on the same day that they were also switching to Coke products after 58 years.

== Locations ==
As of August 2021, Skyline Chili operates 160 restaurants in Ohio (primarily serving Cincinnati, Dayton, and Columbus), Indiana, Kentucky (primarily Lexington, Louisville and the Northern Kentucky suburbs of Cincinnati), and Florida. Additionally, three locations previously operated in Michigan; in Lansing, Monroe, and Traverse City. Skyline coneys are also served inside Goodyear Ballpark, the Arizona spring training home of the Reds and Guardians. The restaurants may be considered fast casual. Diners may sit at a booth or table and be served by a waiter, or at many locations, sit at a counter near employees preparing the food. At all restaurants, dishes are assembled at a centrally located service island so diners may watch their food as it is made. Food prepping takes only a few minutes so one often gets their food quickly. Carry-out and drive-through service are also available at most locations.

Skyline briefly had a location in Pittsburgh in the 1980s. While unsuccessful, Skyline did consider a more aggressive return to the market in the late 1990s. However, Skyline never returned to Western Pennsylvania and has since backed off any expansion plans of any kind for the time being. The chain continues to operate one location in Stow, Ohio, but is largely absent north of Mansfield.

== See also ==
- Gold Star Chili
- Camp Washington Chili
