= Nautic Partners =

Private equity firm

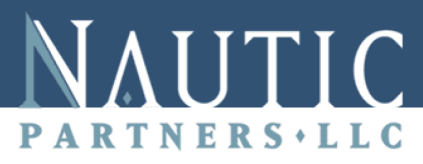
- Company type: Private
- Industry: Private equity
- Founded: 1986
- Headquarters: Providence, Rhode Island, United States
- Products: Leveraged buyout
- Total assets: $2.0 billion
- Number of employees: 20+
- Website: www.nauticpartners.com

Nautic Partners is a private equity firm focused on leveraged buyout investments in middle market companies across a range of industries that includes healthcare, industrial products, and outsourced services.

== History ==
The firm, which is based in Providence, Rhode Island, United States, was founded in 1986 as Fleet Equity Partners, a subsidiary of Fleet Bank. Initially, Fleet Equity Partners invested in private equity exclusively on behalf of the bank. However, beginning in 1993, the team began to accept outside investors. In 2000, Nautic Partners was formed as an independent private equity firm with the majority of its capital for its fifth investment vehicle provided by outside investors. Fleet remained a minority investor.

Among the firm's notable investments are Prince Sports, Fibertech, Big Train Coffee and R2C Group. The firm was also previously the owner of Skyline Chili. Its healthcare investments include All Metro Health Care, Gaymar and Family Physicians Group.

In 2010, the firm sold medical device company Medegen to CareFusion.

In 2015, the firm acquired Source4Teachers, a New Jersey provider of outsourced substitute teacher services.

In 2016, Nautic acquired Endries International from Ferguson Enterprises, selling the company to MSD Partners in December 2018.

In March 2020, Nautic acquired Harrington Industrial Plastics in partnership with Harrington management.

In December 2021, Blackstone Group acquired a minority ownership interest in Nautic Partners.
