= Kiryak Shkurtov =

Bulgarian revolutionary

Kiryak Hristov Shkurtov or Kiriak Shkurtov (Bulgarian: Киряк Христов Шкуртов) (1872 in Starichani, present-day Lakkomata, Greece – 1965 in Plovdiv, Bulgaria) was a Bulgarian revolutionary, voivode of Internal Macedonian-Adrianople Revolutionary Organization in the region of Kostur, present-day Greece.

== Life ==
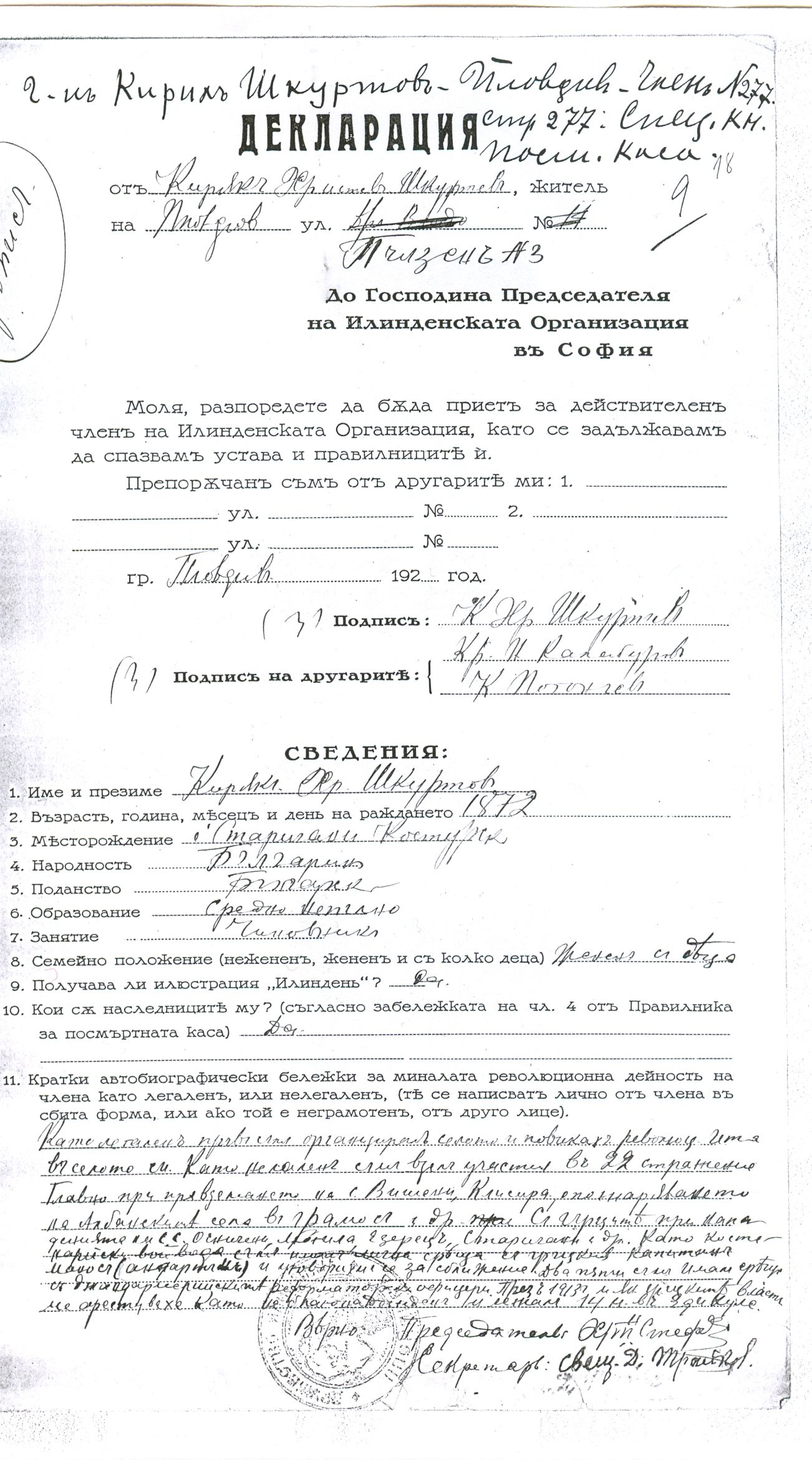
A Declaration by K. Shkurtov in which he briefly describes his revolutionary activity (in Bulgarian)

Kiriyak Shkurtov was born in 1872 in the village of Starichani in the region of Macedonia (today Lakomata in Kastoria regional unit, Greece), at that time part of the Ottoman Empire. He graduated Greek high school and was a teacher.

Shkurtov was one of the first figures and leaders of IMARO in his village. During the Ilinden–Preobrazhenie Uprising he participated in the battle in the village Visheni, in the capture of Kleisoura, in the campaigns of the insurrectional forces in Kolonya and in other fights. After the uprising, together with his comrades he transferred to Greece, where they were originally arrested, but later were released and are offered to join the Greek Committee. Shkurtov wrote in his memoirs:

"We replied that we agree, but to work for an autonomous Macedonia" - against the Turkish tyranny.

In early 1904, despite attempts by the Greek and Turkish authorities to be arrested, Shkurtov returned to the region of Kostur and included in the reconstruction of disorganized IMARO. He was secretary of voyvode Kostando Zhivkov and after his death in December 1904 was appointed a voivode of the region of Kostenariya. He participated in the fights against the Greek andartes - in fighting in defense of the villages Osnicheni (present-day Kastanofito), Ezerets (present-day Petropoulakion), Starichani and others.

Besides his participation in battles, on behalf of the Bulgarian Macedonian revolutionaries Shkurtov was in correspondence with Greek chiefs in which he reproached them for their union with the Ottoman authorities and their actions against IMARO. In January 1905 in a letter to residents of several Greek villages, signed on behalf of deaths already Kostando Zivkov, Shkurtov laid dawn the objective of IMARO as follows:

"We fight to purchase the freedom of all peoples who inhabit this country, Macedonia, regardless of whether they are Bulgarians, Greeks or Vlachs, because we are all under the same tyranny".

At the end of March 1907 Shkurtov gone to treatment in Bulgaria, but after Young Turk Revolution in 1908 returned to Macedonia where he remained to First Balkan War in 1912-1913. In January 1913, after Bulgaria lost the Second Balkan War he was arrested by Greek authorities as an unreliable person and imprisoned for 14 months in the Yedikule Prison in Thessaloniki.

After the First World War Shkurtov lived in Plovdiv, Bulgaria where he worked as a clerk. In 1920s he took an active part in one of the organizations of Macedonian refugees - Ilinden organization and cooperated its magazine Illustration Ilinden, in which he published his memoirs.
