= Kyril Vassilev =

Bulgarian-born American painter (1908–1987)

Kyril Petrov Vassilev (Bulgarian: Кирил Петров Василев; May 24, 1908 – June 21, 1987) was a Bulgarian-born American world-renowned portrait painter of royalty and American society during the mid-20th century. His parents were Bulgarian and stated that he started painting when he was 3 years old.

At the age of 16, Vassilev received his first important portrait commission to paint Bulgaria's Secretary of War, General Lazaroff. He then enrolled in the Bulgarian Academy of Sciences. In 1927, he was selected to paint the official portrait of Bulgaria's King Boris.

In 1929, he completed his masterpiece portrait of the Archbishop Angelo Roncalli, then the papal nuncio to Bulgaria. The Archbishop later became Pope John XXIII. This is the only portrait of Pope John XXIII in his bishop's robe. Vassilev kept the portrait and later rejected an offer of $250,000 for the life-sized oil painting.

Vassilev continued to establish himself as a world-famous portrait artist. He moved to the United States in 1937. He also established a studio in West Palm Beach, where he continued to paint political officials and socialites such as Helen Rich. His friendships included Ernest Hemingway, President Harry S. Truman and Jack Dempsey.

In 1948, Vassilev painted a portrait of American president, Harry S. Truman, which hangs in the Truman Presidential Museum & Library. Vassilev's famous clients included King Peter II of Yugoslavia and King Michael of Romania.

Vassilev died on June 21, 1987, of a heart attack.

In 1989, Norton Gallery of Art in West Palm Beach, Florida, held a retrospective of his work.
