= Nicholas Lambrinides =

Greek-American restaurateur

Nicholas Lambrinides (1879–1962) was a Greek-American entrepreneur who built the Skyline Chili chain of chili restaurants based in Cincinnati, Ohio.

== Early life ==
Lambrinides was born a Greek in Kastoria, then part of the Ottoman Empire, now in Greece. He emigrated to the US in 1912 at age 33.

== Restaurant owner ==
In 1949, Lambrinides and his three sons opened a small restaurant in the Cincinnati area now known as Price Hill. They named the restaurant Skyline Chili because of its panoramic view of downtown Cincinnati.

== Personal life ==
Lambrinides and his wife had five sons.

He died in 1962.
