= Cincinnati chili =

Spiced meat sauce used as a topping for spaghetti

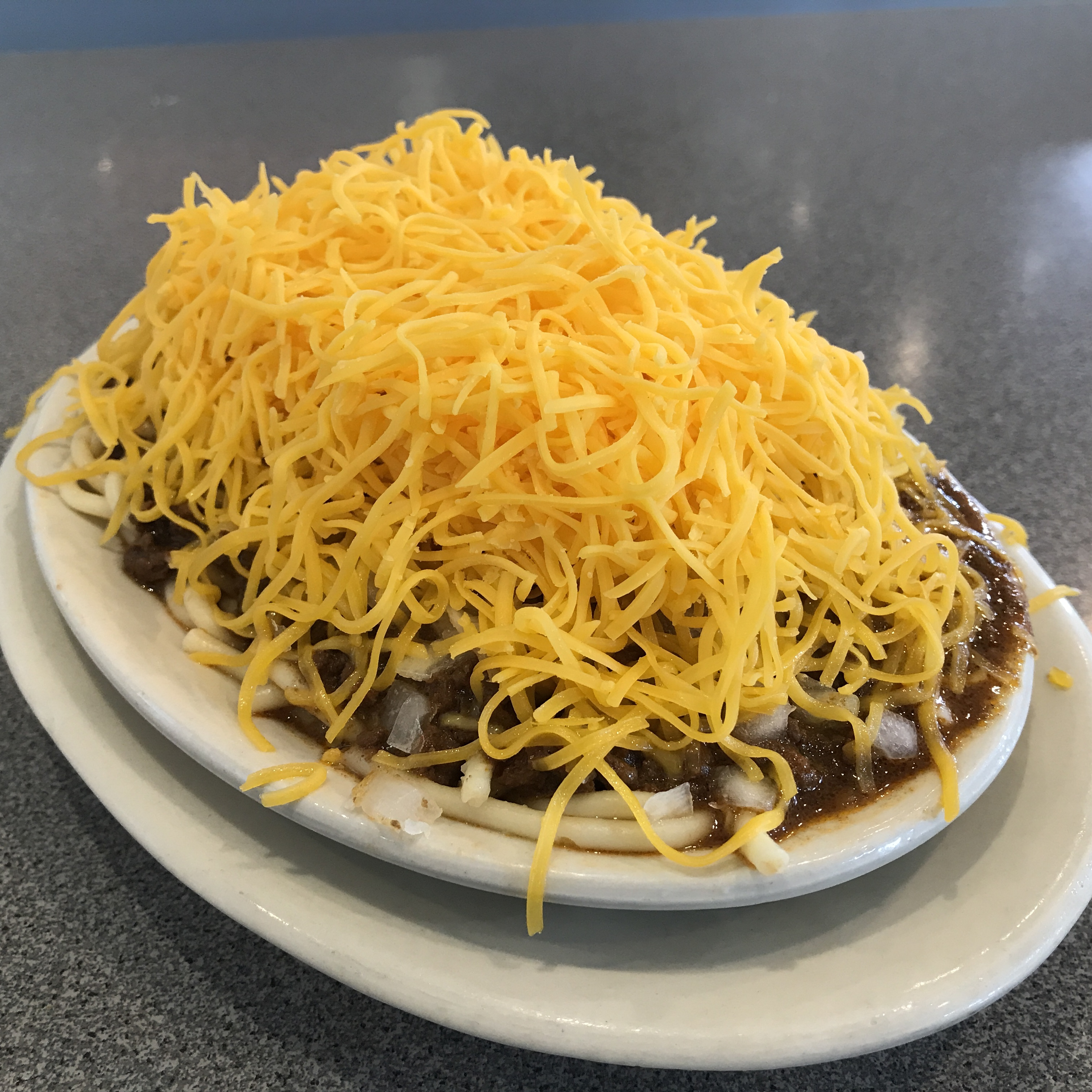
- Four-way Cincinnati chili
- Alternative names: Cincinnati-style chili
- Type: Meat sauce
- Place of origin: United States
- Region or state: Greater Cincinnati
- Created by: Tom Kiradjieff
- Main ingredients: ground beef, tomato paste, spices
- Similar dishes: Rochester hot sauce, hot wiener sauce

Cincinnati chili (or Cincinnati-style chili) is a Mediterranean-spiced meat sauce used as a topping for spaghetti or hot dogs ("coneys"). Both dishes were developed by immigrant restaurateurs in the Cincinnati area during the 1920s. Its name evokes comparison to chili con carne, but the two are dissimilar in consistency, flavor, and serving method; Cincinnati chili more closely resembles Greek pasta sauces and the spiced-meat hot dog topping sauces seen in other parts of the United States.

Ingredients include ground beef, water or stock, tomato paste, spices such as cinnamon, nutmeg, allspice, clove, cumin, chili powder, and bay leaf in a soupy consistency. The dish does not contain chocolate, despite popular myth to the contrary. Customary toppings include cheddar cheese, onions, and beans; specific combinations of toppings are known as "ways". The most popular order is a "three-way", which adds shredded cheese to the chili-topped spaghetti (a "two-way"), while a "four-way" adds onions or beans before topping with the cheese. A "five-way" includes both onions and beans. Ways are often served with oyster crackers and a mild hot sauce. Cincinnati chili is almost never served or eaten by the bowl.

While served in many local restaurants, it is most often associated with the over 250 independent and chain "chili parlors" (restaurants specializing in Cincinnati chili) found throughout Cincinnati metropolitan area, with franchise locations throughout Ohio and in Northern Kentucky, Indiana, Florida, and the Middle East. The dish is the Cincinnati area's best-known regional food. In 2000, one local chili parlor was named an America's Classic by the James Beard Foundation, and in 2013, Smithsonian named the same chili parlor one of the "20 Most Iconic Food Destinations in America".

== Origins and history ==
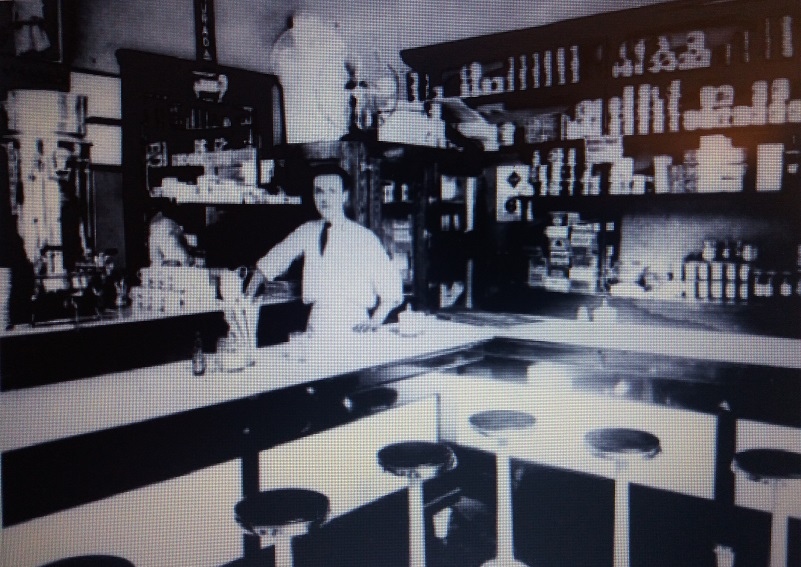
John Kiradjieff posing in Empress Chili in 1925

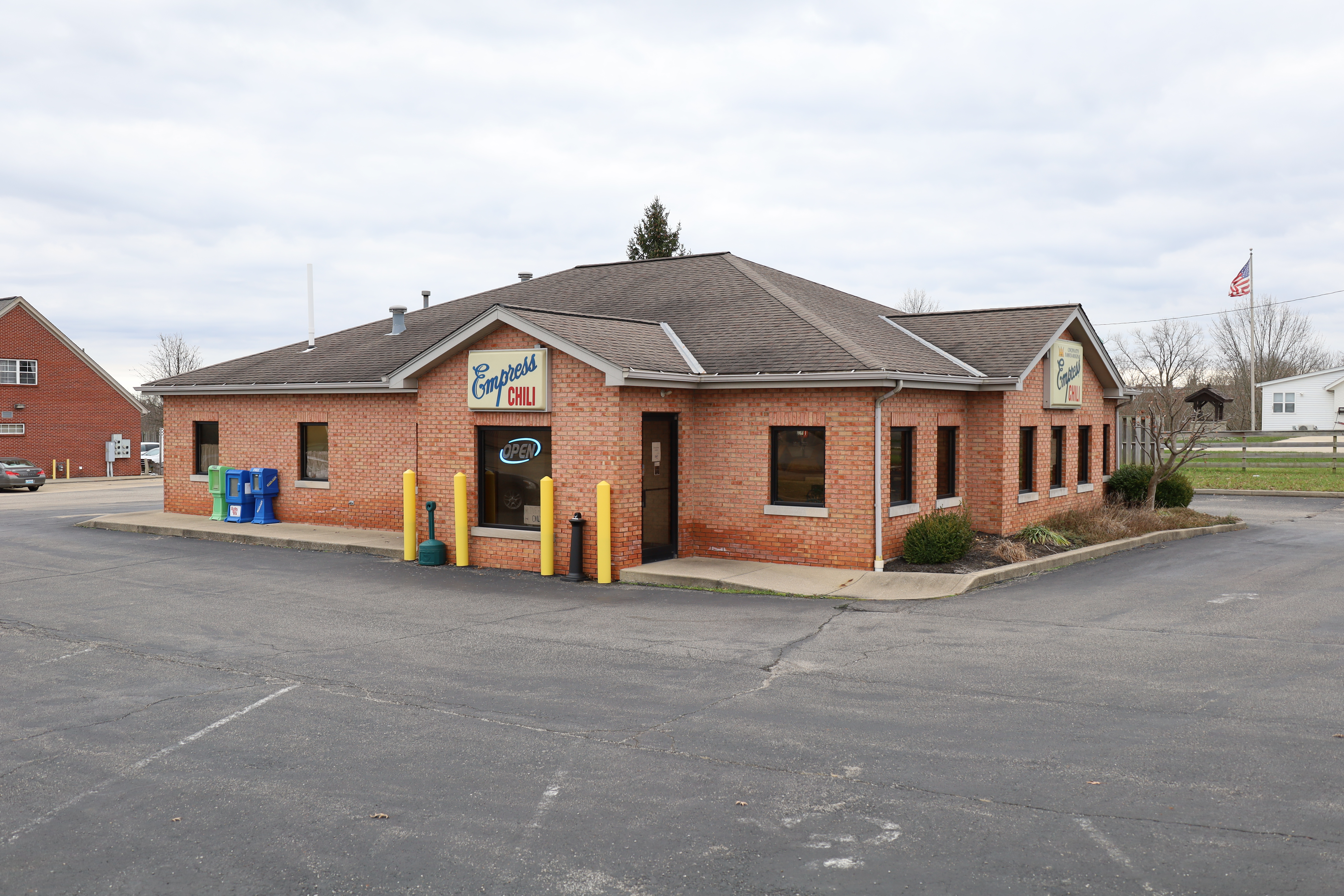
The only current location of Empress Chili in Alexandria, Kentucky

Cincinnati chili originated with immigrant restaurateurs who were trying to expand their customer base by moving beyond narrowly ethnic styles of cuisine. Tom and John Kiradjieff emigrated from the village of Hrupishta (present-day Argos Orestiko, Greece), fleeing ethnic rivalries and bigotry in the fallout from the Balkan Wars and World War I, in 1921. They began serving a "stew with traditional Mediterranean spices" as a topping for hot dogs which they called "coneys" in 1922 at their hot dog stand located next to a burlesque theater called the Empress, which they named their business after.

Tom Kiradjieff used the sauce to modify a traditional dish, speculated to have been pastitsio, moussaka or saltsa kima to come up with a dish he called "chili spaghetti." He first developed a recipe calling for the spaghetti to be cooked in the chili but changed his method in response to customer requests and began serving the sauce as a topping, eventually adding grated cheese as a topping for both the chili spaghetti and the coneys, also in response to customer requests.

To make ordering more efficient, the brothers created the "way" system of ordering. The style has since been copied and modified by many other restaurant proprietors, often Greek and Macedonian immigrants who had worked at Empress restaurants before leaving to open their own chili parlors, often following the business model to the point of locating their restaurants adjacent to theaters.

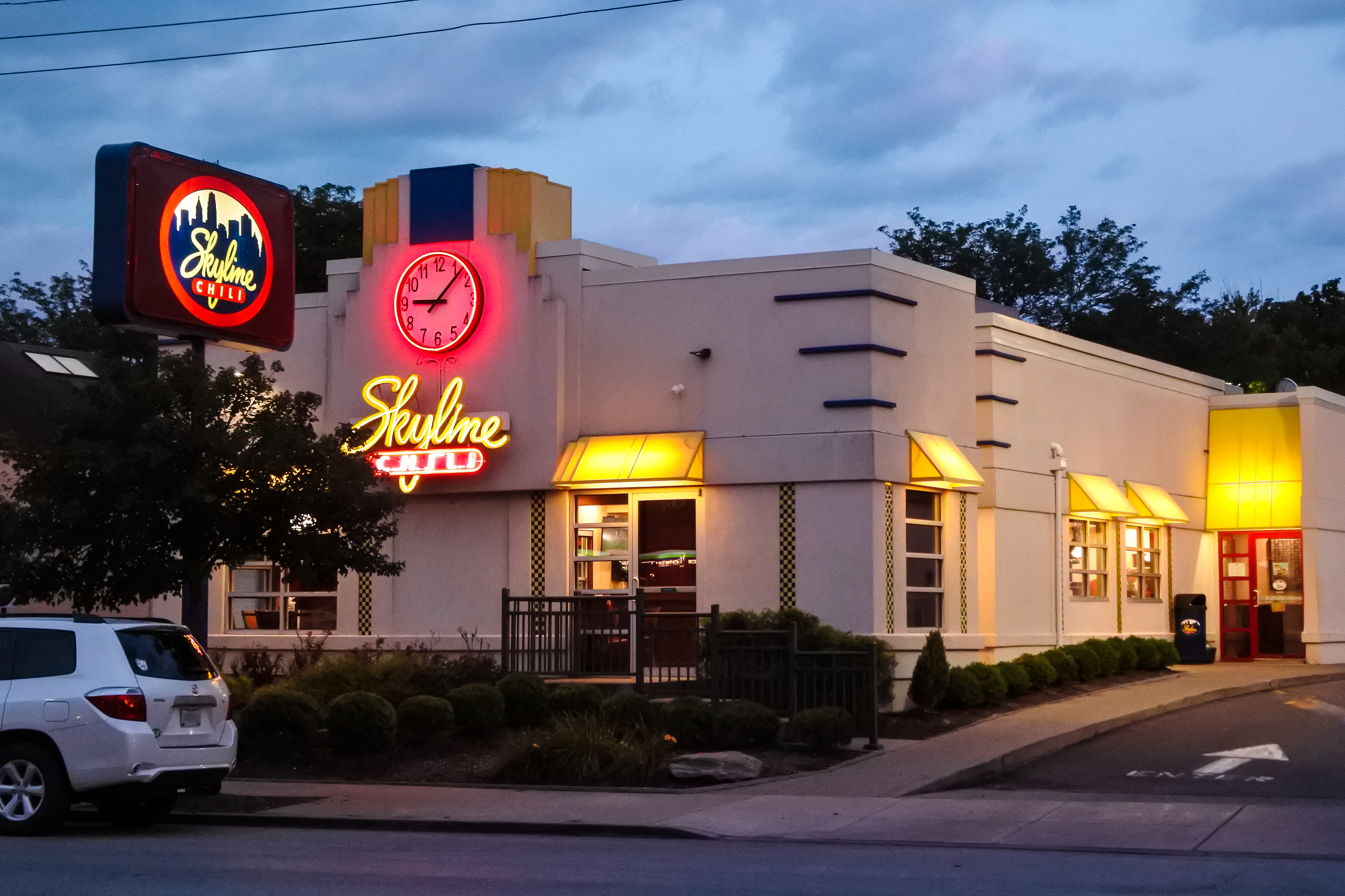
Skyline Chili location in Cincinnati

Empress was the largest chili parlor chain in Cincinnati until 1949, when a former Empress employee and Greek immigrant, Nicholas Lambrinides, started Skyline Chili. In 1965, four brothers named Daoud, immigrants from Jordan, bought a restaurant called Hamburger Heaven from a former Empress employee. They noticed that the Cincinnati chili was outselling the hamburgers on their menu and changed the restaurant's name to Gold Star Chili. As of 2015, Skyline (with over 130 locations) and Gold Star (with 89 locations) were the largest Cincinnati chili parlor chains, while Empress had only two remaining locations, down from over a dozen during the chain's most successful period.

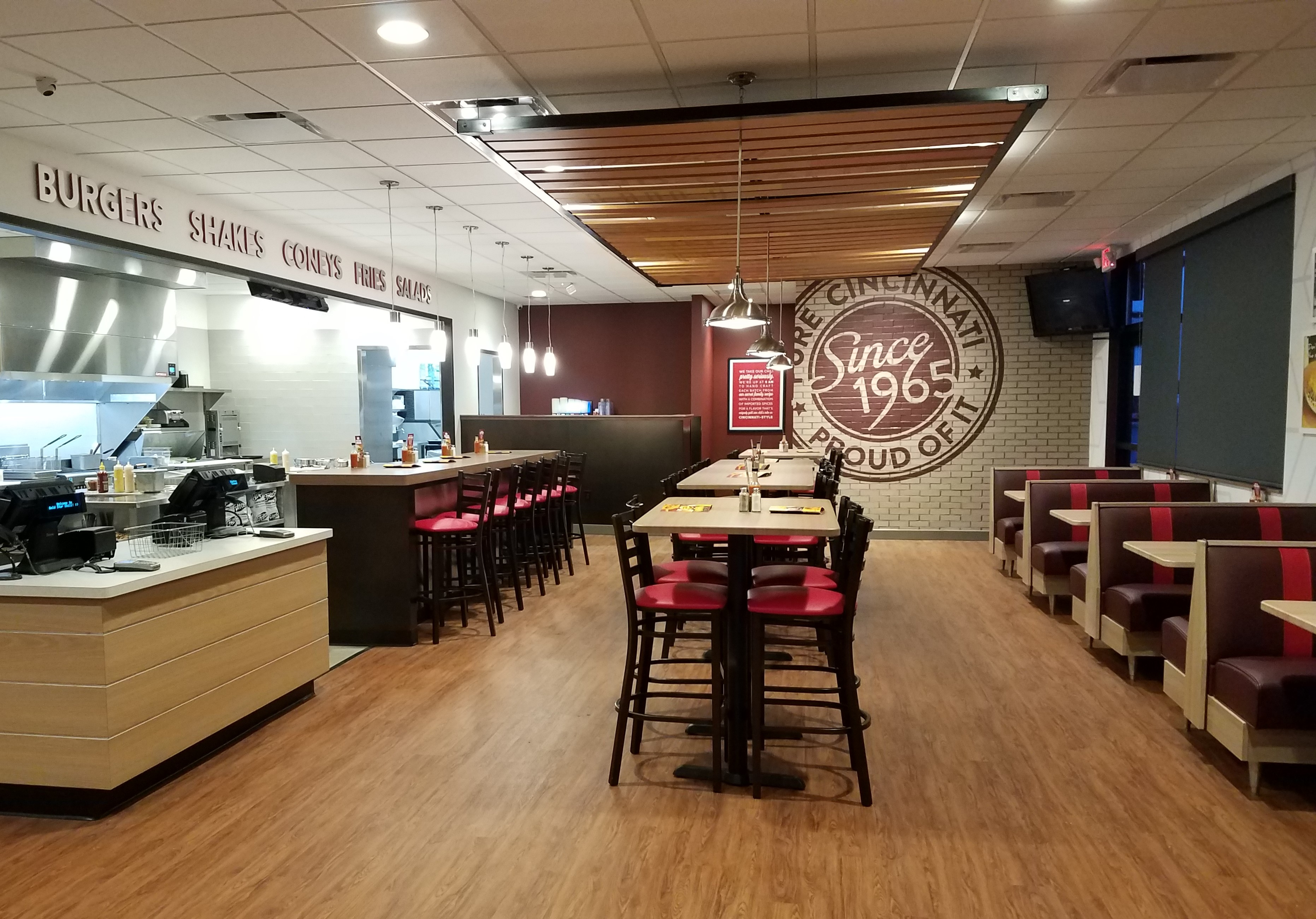
Gold Star Chili restaurant interior

Besides Empress, Skyline, and Gold Star, there are also smaller chains such as Dixie Chili and Deli and numerous independents including the acclaimed Camp Washington Chili. Other independents include Pleasant Ridge Chili, Blue Ash Chili, Park Chili Parlor, Price Hill Chili, Chili Time, Orlando-based Cincinnati Chili Company, and the Blue Jay Restaurant, numbering more than 250 chili parlors. In 1985, one of the founders of Gold Star Chili, Fahid Daoud, returned to Jordan, where he opened his own parlor, called Chili House. Outside of Jordan, Chili House as of 2020 had locations in Iran, Iraq, Libya, Oman, Palestine, Turkey and Qatar.

In addition to the chili parlors, some version of Cincinnati chili is commonly served at many local restaurants. Arnold's Bar and Grill, the oldest bar in the city, serves a vegetarian "Cincy Lentils" dish ordered in "ways". Melt Eclectic Cafe offers a vegan three-way. For Restaurant Week 2018, a local mixologist developed a cocktail called "Manhattan Skyline", a Cincinnati chili-flavored whiskey cocktail.

The history of Cincinnati chili shares many factors in common with the apparently independent but simultaneous development of the Coney Island hot dog in other areas of the United States. According to Jane and Michael Stern "Virtually all" were developed by Greek or Macedonian immigrants who passed through Ellis Island as they fled the fallout from the Balkan Wars in the first two decades of the twentieth century.

== Ingredients ==
Cincinnati chili is always seasoned with cinnamon, allspice, cloves, cumin, nutmeg, and chili powder. A popular myth is that the dish contains a small amount of dark unsweetened chocolate, but according to Dann Woellert, author of The Authentic History of Cincinnati Chili writing in 2013, "There is no chili parlor in Cincinnati that uses chocolate in its chili." The Cincinnati Enquirer confirmed in 2021. Daniel Walton, writing in Bon Appetit in 2024, confirmed "never chocolate".

== Preparation, ordering, serving and eating ==
Raw ground beef is crumbled in water or stock. Tomato paste and seasonings are added and the mix is brought to a boil then simmered for several hours to form a thin meat sauce.

Many recipes call for an overnight chill in the refrigerator to allow for easy skimming of fat and to allow flavors to develop, then reheating to serve.

Preparation of a Cincinnati chili four-way

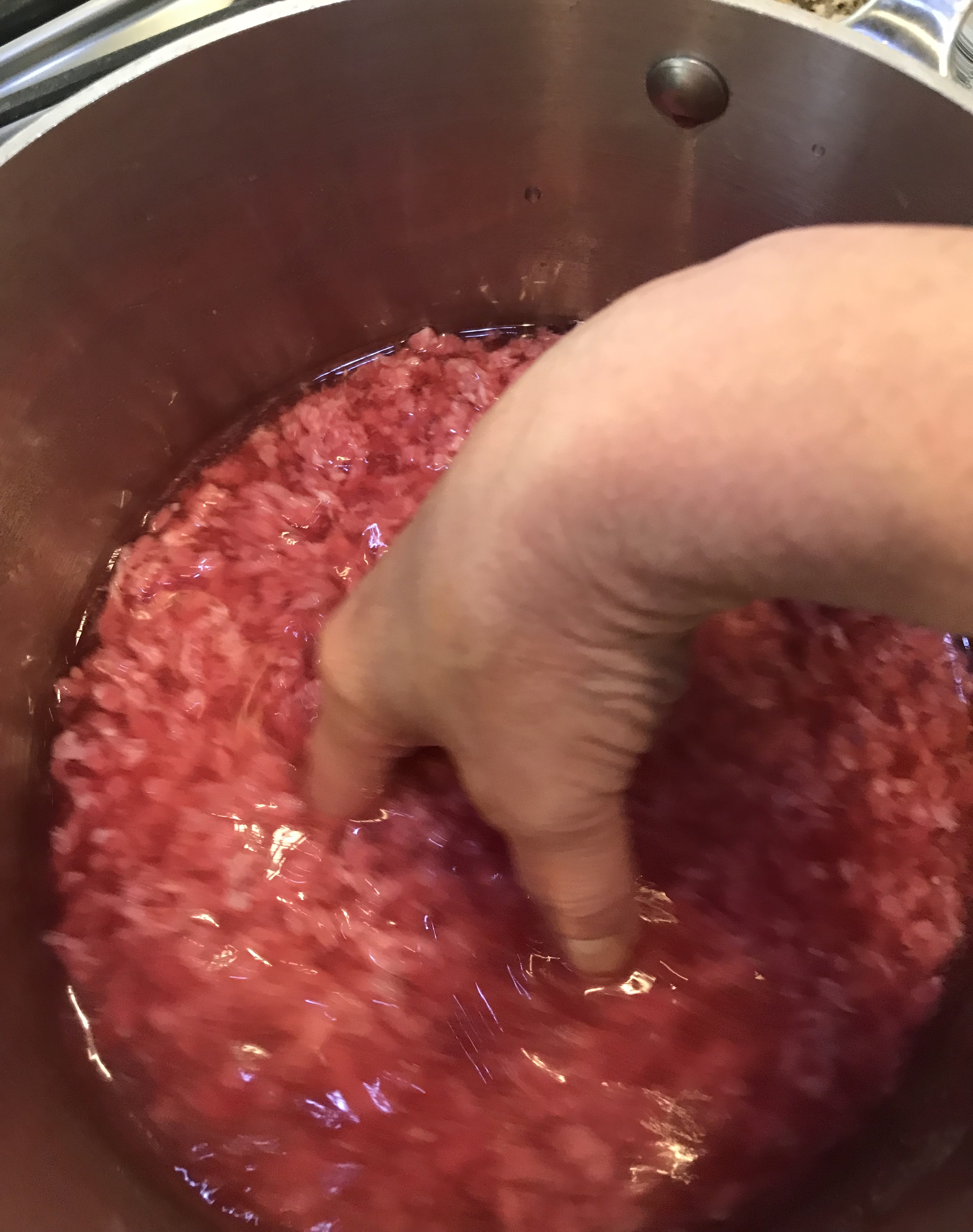
Ground beef is crumbled into water.

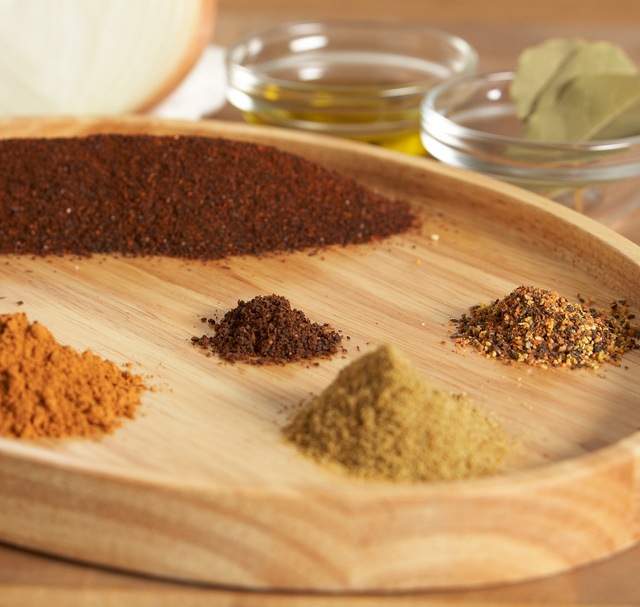
Spices and tomato paste are added and the water brought to a boil, then simmered for several hours.

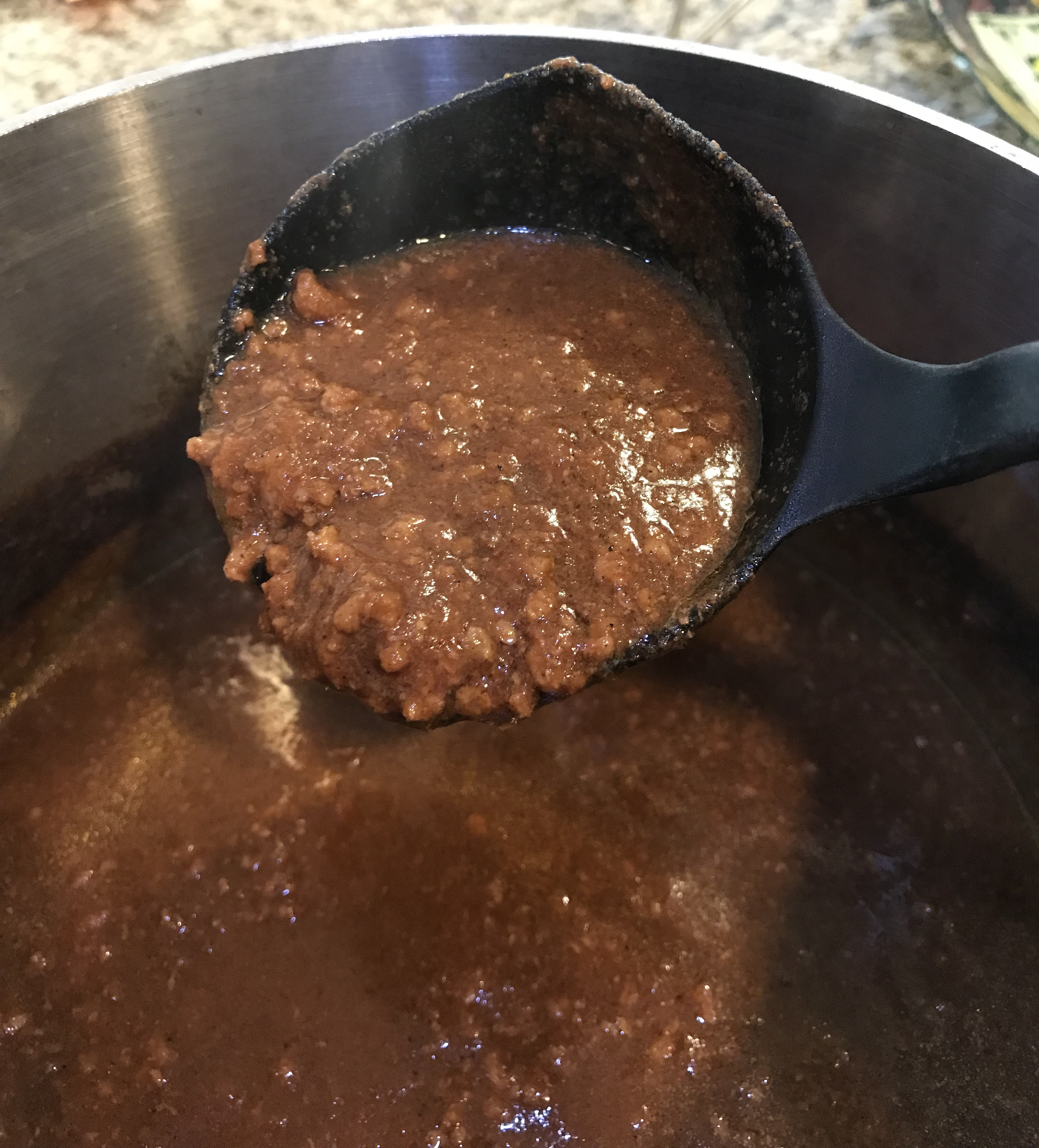
Finished Cincinnati chili

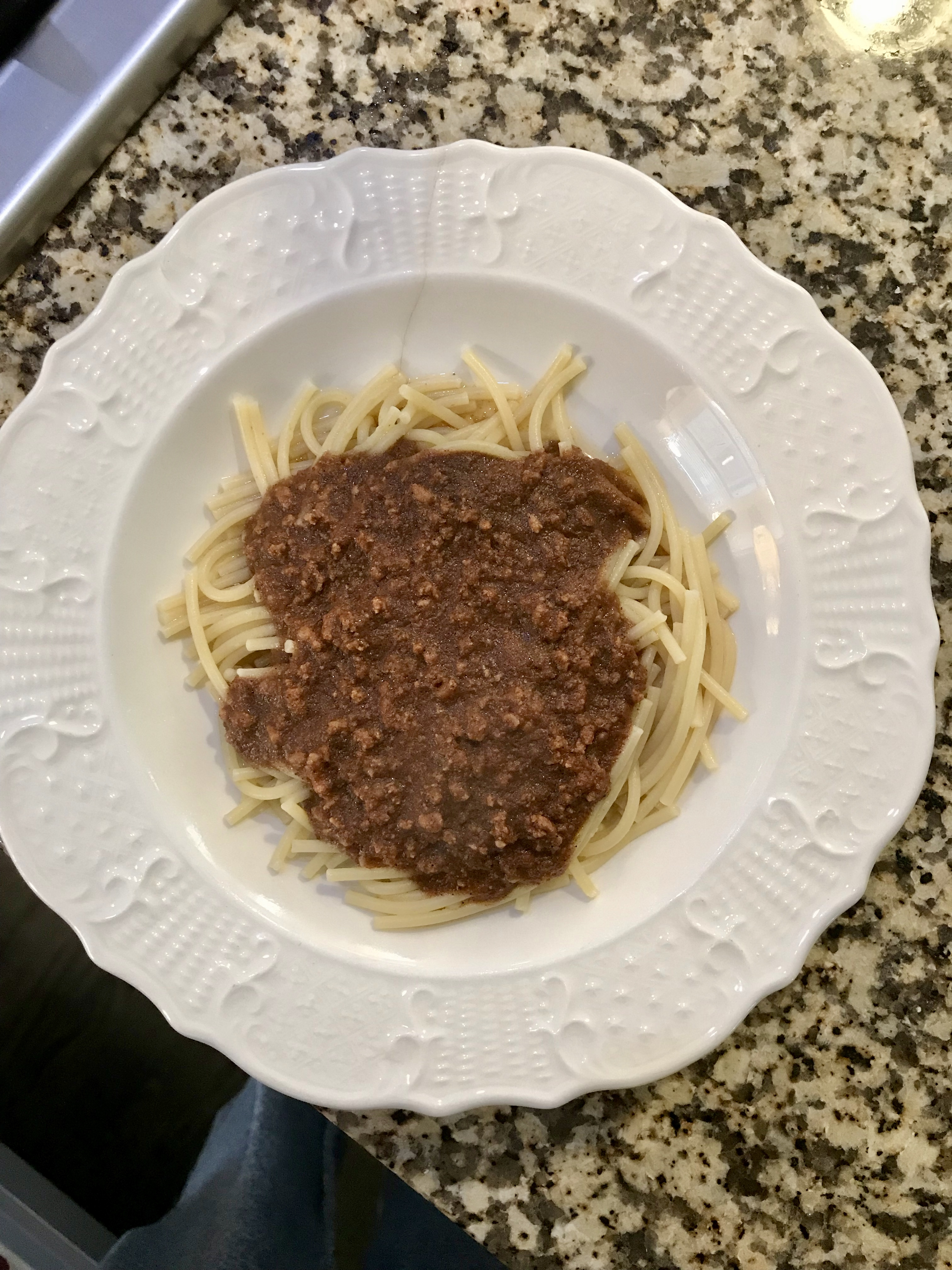
Spaghetti topped with chili, a "two-way"

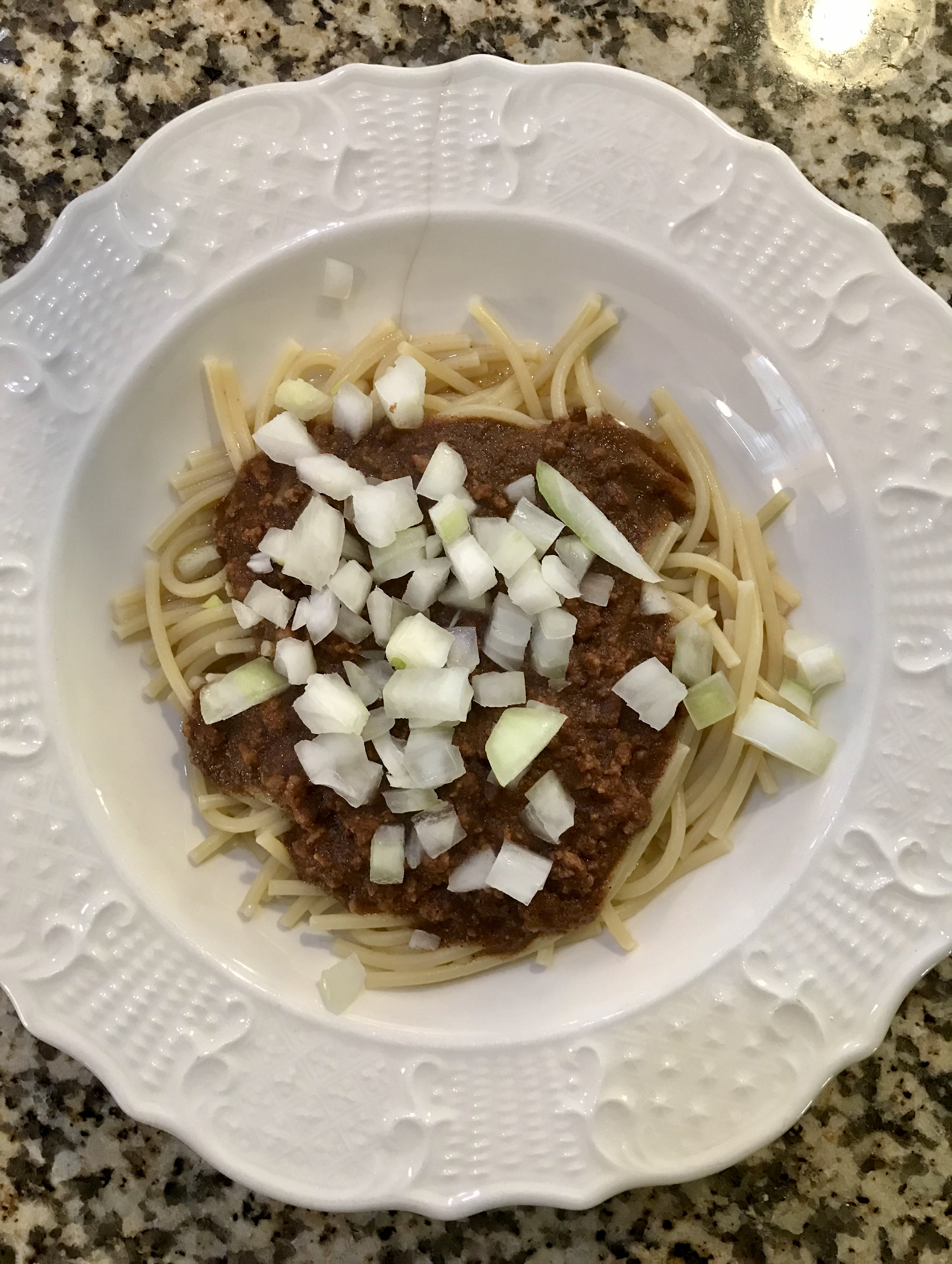
Onions (or beans) are placed atop the chili.

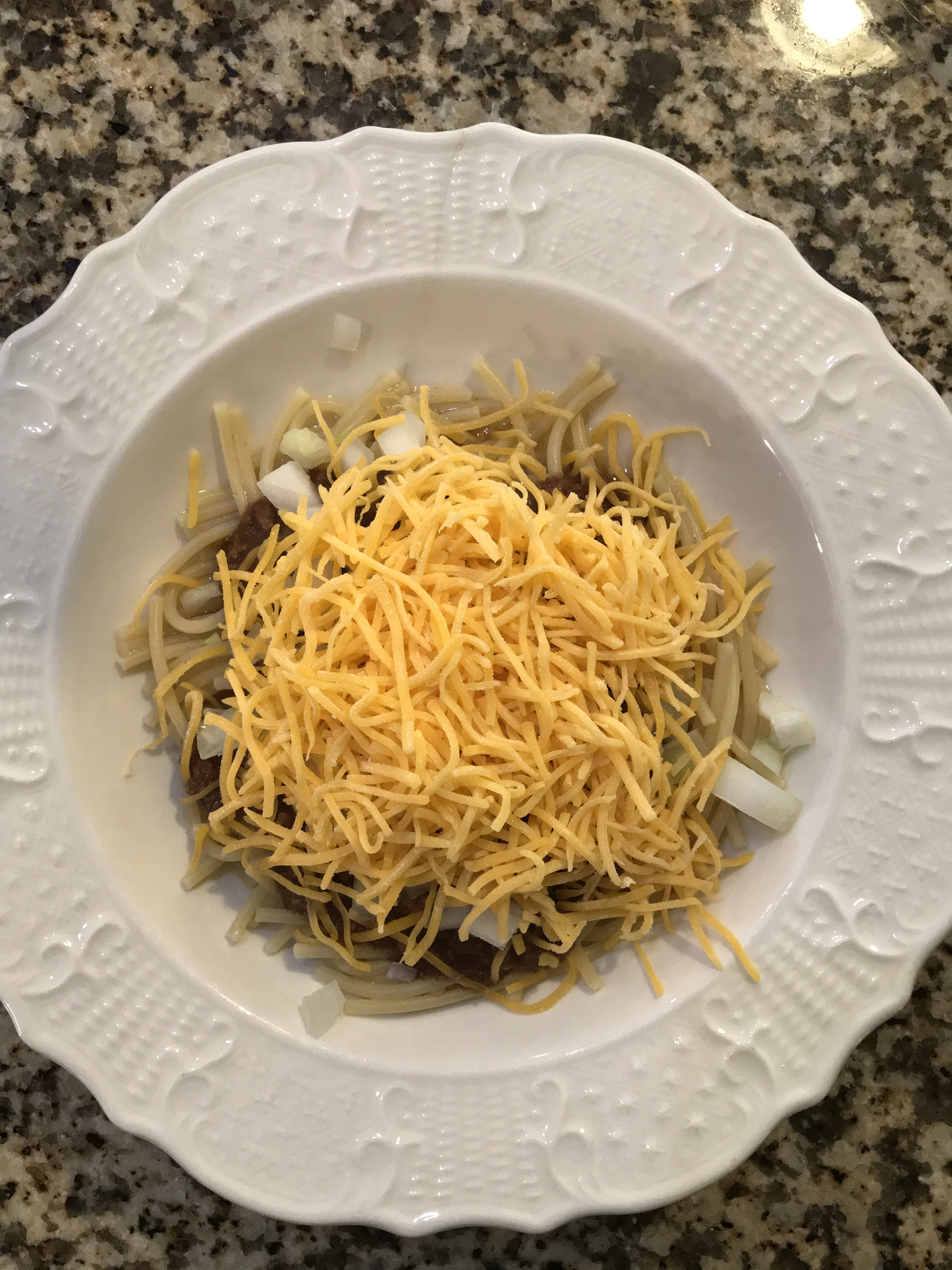
Shredded cheese completes the "four-way".

=== The "way" system ===
Ordering Cincinnati chili is based on a specific ingredient series: chili, spaghetti, shredded cheddar cheese, diced onions, and kidney beans. The number before the "way" of the chili determines which ingredients are included in each chili order. Customers order a:

- Two-way: spaghetti topped with chili (also called "chili spaghetti")
- Three-way: spaghetti, chili, and cheese
- Four-way onion: spaghetti, chili, onions, and cheese
- Four-way bean: spaghetti, chili, beans, and cheese
- Five-way: spaghetti, chili, beans, onions, and cheese

Partially eaten five-way from Skyline, garnished with oyster crackers

Skyline cheese coney topped with Cincinnati-style chili, mustard, onions, and a heap of shredded cheese

Some chili parlors will also serve the dish "inverted": cheese on the bottom, so that it melts. Some restaurants, among them Skyline and Gold Star, do not use the term "four-way bean", instead using the term "four-way" to denote a three-way plus the customer's choice of onions or beans. Some restaurants may add extra ingredients to the way system; for example, Dixie Chili offers a "six-way", which adds chopped garlic to a five-way.

Cincinnati chili is also used as a hot dog topping to make a "coney", a regional variation on the Coney Island chili dog, which is topped with shredded cheddar cheese to make a "cheese coney". The standard coney also includes mustard and chopped onion. The "three-way" and the cheese coney are the most popular orders.

There is no "one-way", and very few customers order a bowl of plain chili. Most chili parlors do not offer plain chili as a regular menu item. Polly Campbell, former food editor of The Cincinnati Enquirer, calls ordering a bowl of Cincinnati chili "Ridiculous. Would you order a bowl of spaghetti sauce? Because that's what you're doing."

=== Serving and eating ===
Ways and coneys are traditionally served in a shallow oval bowl. Oyster crackers are usually served with Cincinnati chili, and a mild hot sauce such as Tabasco is frequently available to be used as an optional topping to be added at the table. Locals typically eat Cincinnati chili as if it were a casserole, cutting each bite with the side of the fork instead of twirling the noodles.

== Misnomer ==
The name "Cincinnati chili" is often confusing to those unfamiliar with it, because the term "chili" evokes the expectation of chili con carne, to which it "bears no resemblance". Cincinnati chili is a Mediterranean-spiced meat sauce for spaghetti or hot dogs, and is very seldom eaten by the bowl as is typical with chili con carne. It is common for Cincinnatians to describe it starting with, "Well, it's not really chili ..." Cincinnati Enquirer food editor Chuck Martin and Cincinnati Magazine dining editor Donna Covrett agree, "It is not chili." The 1991 edition of Joy of Cooking warns "skeptical or puzzled" readers, "We suggest you think of it as a Macedonian Bolognese sauce instead."

It is normally of a thin consistency, closer to a soup than a stew, and contains no vegetables or chunks of meat. The flavors, consistency and serving method are more similar to Greek pasta sauces or the spiced meat sauces used to top hot dogs in Rochester and other parts of Upstate New York, Rhode Island, and Michigan than they are to chili con carne.

== Reception ==
Cincinnati chili is the area's "best known regional food" and according to Woellert is, along with goetta and mock turtle soup, one of Cincinnati's "holy trinity" of local specialties. According to the Greater Cincinnati Convention and Visitors Bureau, Cincinnatians consume more than 2,000,000 lb (910,000 kg) of Cincinnati chili each year, topped by 850,000 lb (390,000 kg) of shredded cheddar cheese. Overall industry revenues were $250 million in 2014.

Anthony Bourdain called it "the story of America on your plate". National food critics Jane and Michael Stern wrote, "As connoisseurs of blue-plate food, we consider Cincinnati chili one of America's quintessential meals" and "one of this nation's most distinctive regional plates of food". Writer and public speaker Fran Lebowitz said "The main thing I remember about Cincinnati was a fantastic dish that was spaghetti and chili." When asked to confirm that the famously curmudgeonly Fran Lebowitz liked Cincinnati chili, she answered, "Oh, yes. Why isn't that catching on around the country?"

Huffington Post named it one of "15 Beloved Regional Dishes". In 2000, Camp Washington Chili won a James Beard Foundation America's Classics Award. In 2013, Smithsonian named Camp Washington Chili as one of "20 Most Iconic Food Destinations in America". John McIntyre, writing in The Baltimore Sun, called it "the most perfect of fast foods", and opined that "if the Greeks who invented it nearly a century ago had called it something other than chili, the [chili] essentialists would be able to enjoy it." In 2015, Thrillist named it "the one food you must eat in Ohio". In 2022 the Washington Post called it "a regional favorite worthy of a national stage".

Eater called it "America's most controversial plate of pasta". It is common for those unfamiliar with it and expecting chili con carne to "scorn it" as a poor example of chili. A 2013 piece published by the sports and culture website Deadspin went so far as to call it "horrifying diarrhea sludge". In 2021, during broadcast of a Cincinnati Reds–New York Mets game, Mets announcer Gary Cohen showed a video of the preparation of a five-way, advising, "try it once, and you'll never eat it again." The New York Times in 2017 described one chain's version of Cincinnati chili as "a gummy nest of thin noodles, which were covered by a watery chili, which was in turn covered by rubbery orange confetti that bore a passing resemblance to cheese".

== In popular culture ==
Blues musician Lonnie Mack, who was born and raised just outside Cincinnati, released a guitar instrumental called "Camp Washington Chili" on his 1986 album Second Sight.

Country music duo Big & Rich sang about flying through Cincinnati and grabbing a bowl of Skyline chili in their song "Comin' to Your City" on the 2005 album of the same name.

Cincinnati chili is used allegorically as a symbol for vapid social interaction and social disconnection in the 2015 animated film Anomalisa, as the main character when on a business trip to Cincinnati is exhorted in multiple banal encounters to try the local specialty.

During the 2022 NFL postseason, Cincinnati Bengals fans shotgunned cans of chili for luck or took shots of chili in honor of kicker Evan McPherson, whose nickname is "shooter". Shotgunning cans of chili to celebrate or for luck in sporting events dates back to at least 2018, when a Cincinnati Reds fan used it to celebrate a trade.

== Similar dishes ==
- Chili dog, the generic term for a hot dog topped with meat sauce
- Chili John's, founded in Green Bay, Wisconsin, by a Lithuanian immigrant, offers "Green Bay chili", a dish similar to a five-way created in 1913
- Chili mac, which tops pasta with chili con carne rather than Cincinnati chili
- Coney Island hot dog, a dish similar to a coney developed by Greek-Macedonian immigrants, apparently independently, across the Midwest

== See also ==
- Cuisine of the Midwestern United States
- List of regional dishes of the United States
- Filipino spaghetti, another example of a fusion-cuisine spaghetti dish
- Barbecue spaghetti, another fusion-cuisine spaghetti dish
- Haitian spaghetti, another fusion-cuisine spaghetti dish
