= Gold Star Chili =

American restaurant chain

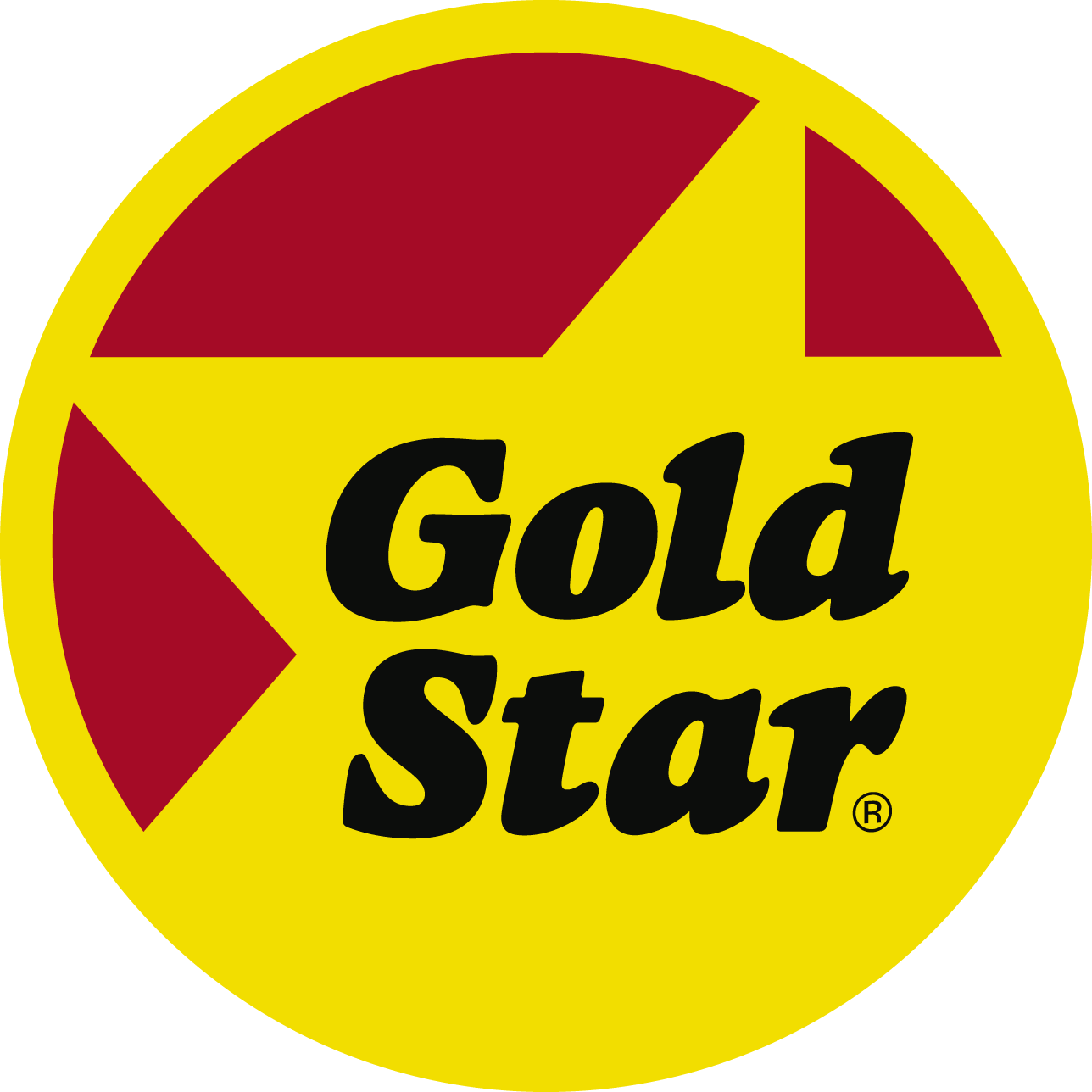

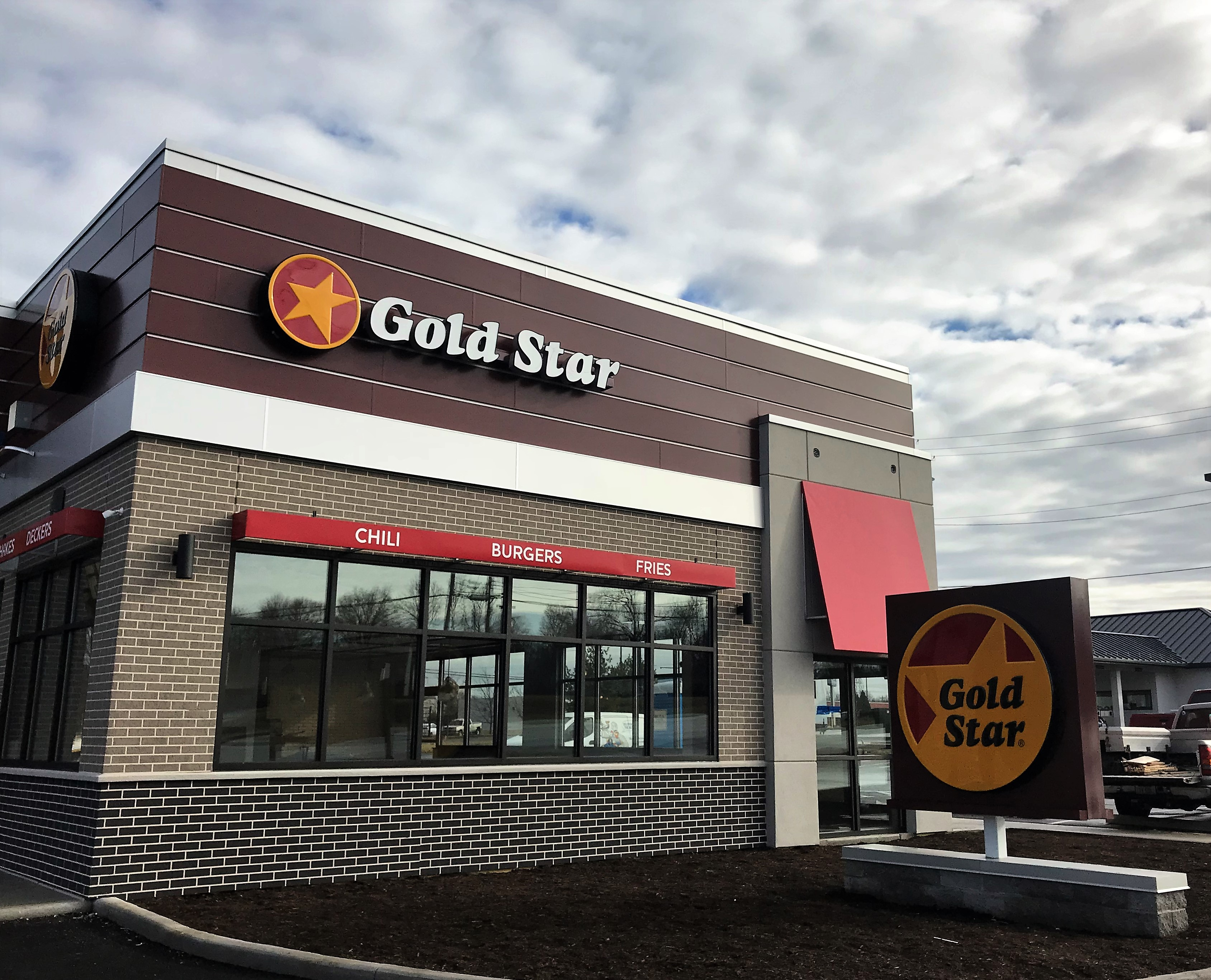
- Gold Star Chili in Withamsville, Ohio
- Type: Private
- Industry: Food service Franchising
- Founded: 1965 in Cincinnati, Ohio, USA
- Founder: Four Daoud brothers (Fahhad, Fahid, Basheer, Bishara)
- Headquarters: 650 Lunken Park Drive, Cincinnati, Ohio, 45226-1800
- Area served: Ohio, Kentucky, Indiana
- Key people: Roger David, CEO
- Products: Cincinnati chili
- Website: goldstarchili.com

Gold Star Chili is a restaurant chain based in Cincinnati, Ohio, that sells Cincinnati chili. The original restaurant was established in the Cincinnati neighborhood of Mt. Washington in 1965 by four Daoud brothers, immigrants from Jordan. Gold Star Chili was the "Official Chili" of the Cincinnati Bengals until April 19, 2023.

== History ==
Gold Star Chili was founded in 1965 by four Daoud brothers (Fahhad, Fahid, Basheer, and Bishara) in Mount Washington, originally under the name Hamburger Heaven. The Daoud brothers immigrated from a village in Jordan in 1957.

As the original name suggests, the original vision for their restaurant was primarily hamburgers. However, they also had a chili recipe that they began modifying, soon finding that customers were ordering the chili more than any of the other menu items. As a result, the brothers changed the restaurant name to Gold Star Chili and removed many of the other items from their menu. The brothers, some of whom eventually changed their family name to David, continued to run the restaurant as it grew into a chain until retiring in 1990. For the next quarter-century, the Daoud/David family brought in CEOs with outside experience.

In 1993 Tony Pérez, then manager of the Cincinnati Reds and former member of the Big Red Machine, kicked off a promotion campaign for the restaurant. During his baseball years, Pérez's nickname was "Big Dog"; since the chain was ready to promote its new foot long cheese coney, Gold Star saw a promotional opportunity and named it "Big Doggie". For the promotion, the store offered customers 16-inch (410 mm) miniature Louisville Slugger baseball bats for US$1.99, and Pérez did various in-store signing sessions for fans. In the past, Gold Star Chili has also hired other Reds players for promotional campaigns, most notably Pete Rose.

In May 2015, the founding family returned to the company's top management when one of the founders' sons, Roger David, became CEO upon the retirement of Mike Rohrkemper. The younger David spent 10 years working in Gold Star's marketing department after college, and then served as a marketing executive at two other firms. Next, he spent 10 years as CEO of another Cincinnati-based restaurant chain, Buffalo Wings & Rings, before returning to Gold Star.

In October 2017, the company acquired Cincinnati chain Tom and Chee, a fast-casual restaurant known for grilled cheese and for being seen on Shark Tank, in an undisclosed deal.

For several years, Gold Star Chili had been a major sponsor of the Cincinnati Bengals until April 19, 2023, when the company announced that their deal with the Bengals was over.

== Signature chili ==
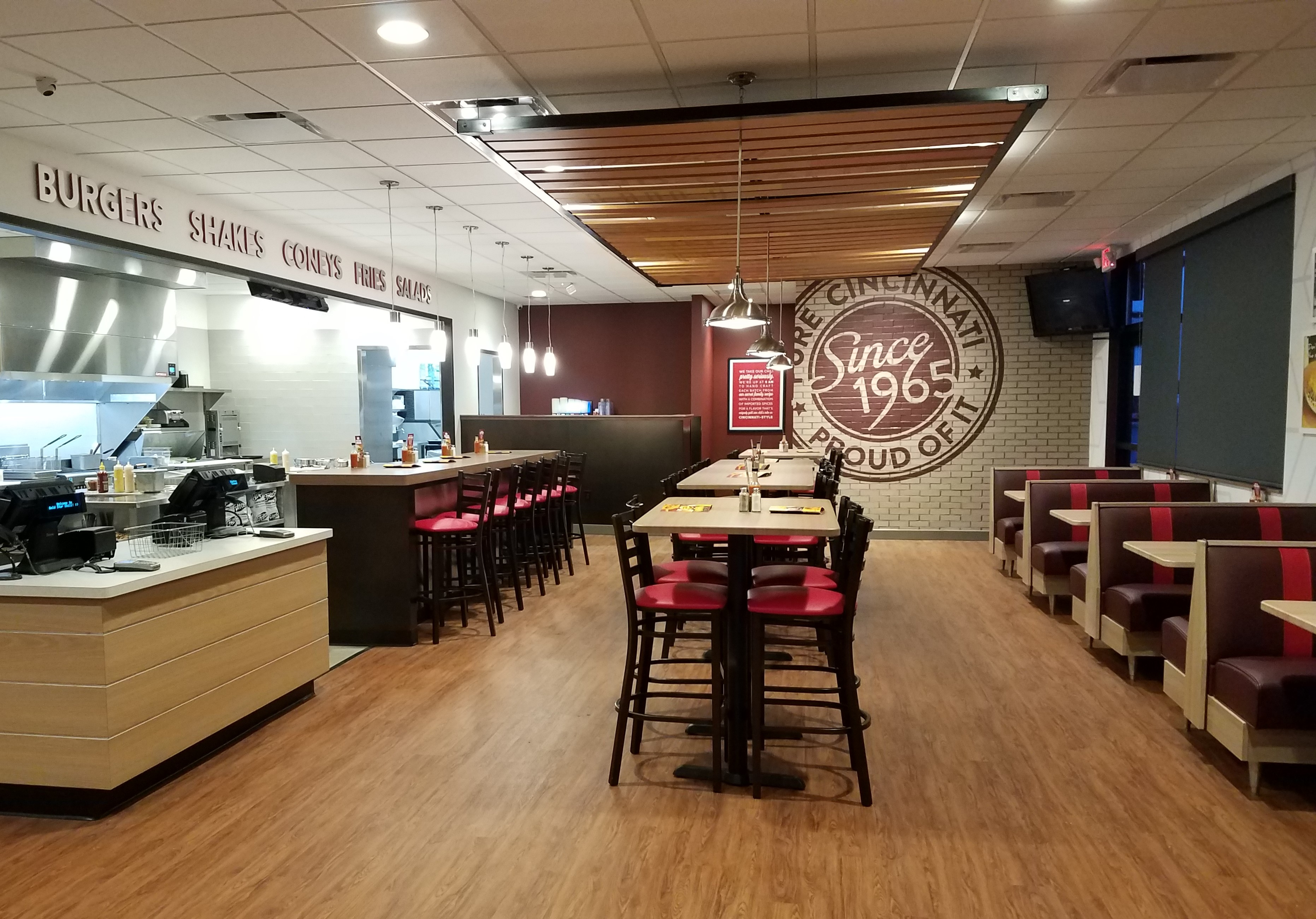
The interior of a Gold Star Chili restaurant in Liberty Township, OH.

The famous chili is produced at the chain's commissary and features the Daoud brothers’ secret blend of spices. While measurements are unknown, the recipe most likely contains three common Greek spices (nutmeg/mace, cinnamon, cloves) plus a balance of sweet (coriander, cardamom, anise, ginger, allspice), spicy (garlic, chili powder, paprika, cumin) and herby (oregano, thyme) ingredients. Most Cincinnati chili recipes also include lean ground beef, sweet onions, tomato sauce and water.

According to an interview with Basheer Daoud (a son of one of the founders) by Neal Conan of National Public Radio in 2005, the chain's commissary produces nearly 20,000 pounds (9,100 kg) of food product for the restaurants per day.

== Locations ==
Gold Star Chili restaurants, both company-owned and franchised, are located in Ohio, Kentucky, and Indiana—a total of 85 as of October 2016. Additionally, a relative of the Daoud family founded Chili House restaurants that serve a similar product in Egypt, Jordan, Bahrain, Iraq, Saudi Arabia and Syria.
