= Filipino spaghetti =

Filipino adaptation of spaghetti bolognese

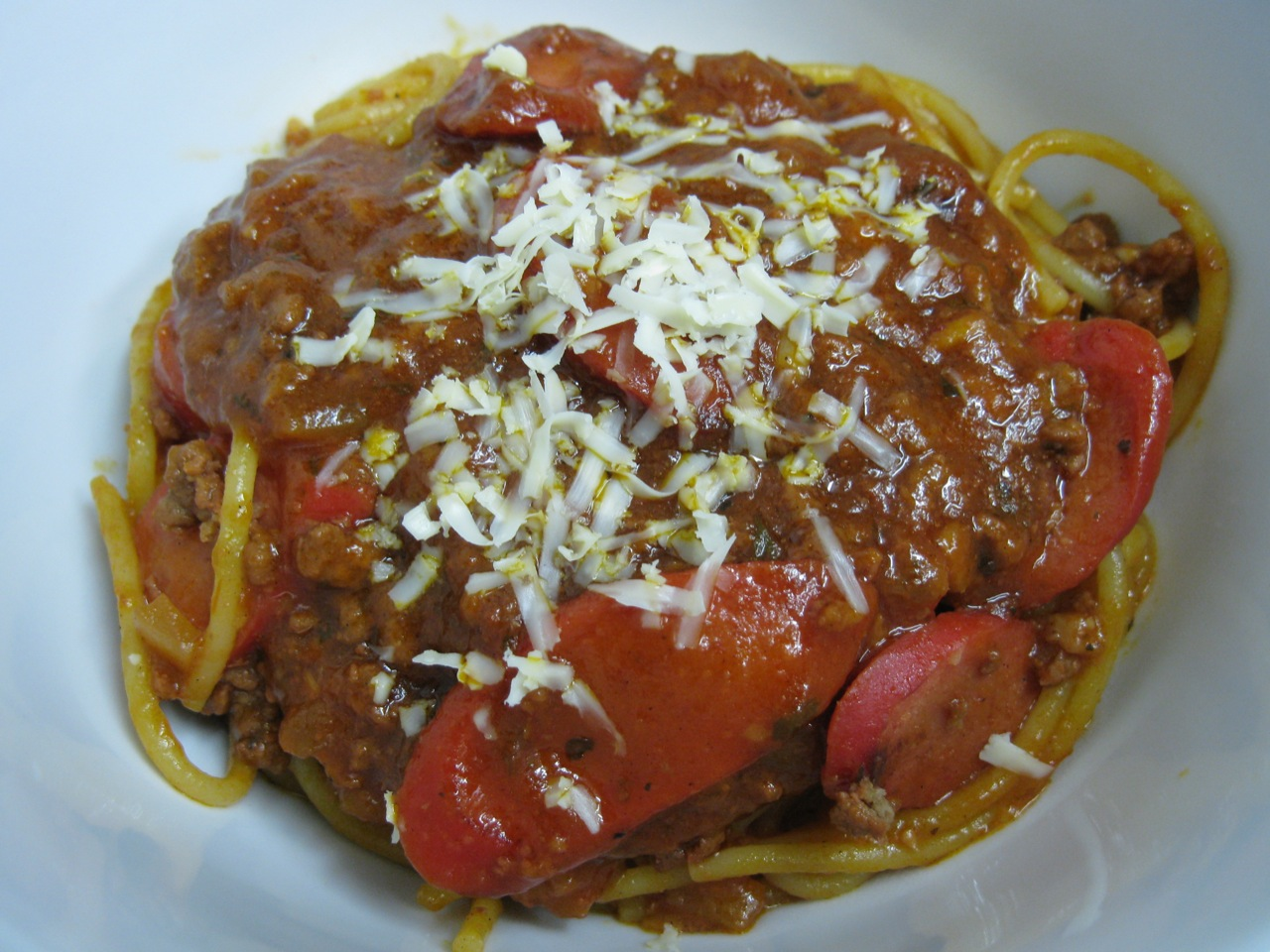
- Filipino spaghetti with hot dogs and cheese
- Alternative names: Sweet spaghetti
- Type: Pasta
- Course: Main dish
- Place of origin: Philippines
- Serving temperature: Hot
- Main ingredients: Spaghetti, tomato sauce, tomato paste, banana ketchup, brown sugar or condensed milk, giniling, hot dogs, cheese

Filipino spaghetti (also known as sweet spaghetti) is a Filipino adaptation of Italian spaghetti with Bolognese sauce. It has a distinctively sweet sauce, usually made from tomato sauce sweetened with brown sugar, banana ketchup, or condensed milk. It is typically topped with sliced hot dogs or smoked longganisa sausages, giniling (ground meat), and grated cheese. It is regarded as a comfort food in Philippine cuisine. It is typically served on almost any special occasion, especially on children's birthdays.

== Origins ==
The dish is believed to date back to the period between the 1940s and the 1960s. During the American Colonial Period, a shortage of tomato supplies in World War II forced the local development of banana ketchup. Spaghetti with Bolognese sauce was introduced by the Americans and was tweaked to suit the local Filipino predilection for sweet dishes.

== Description ==
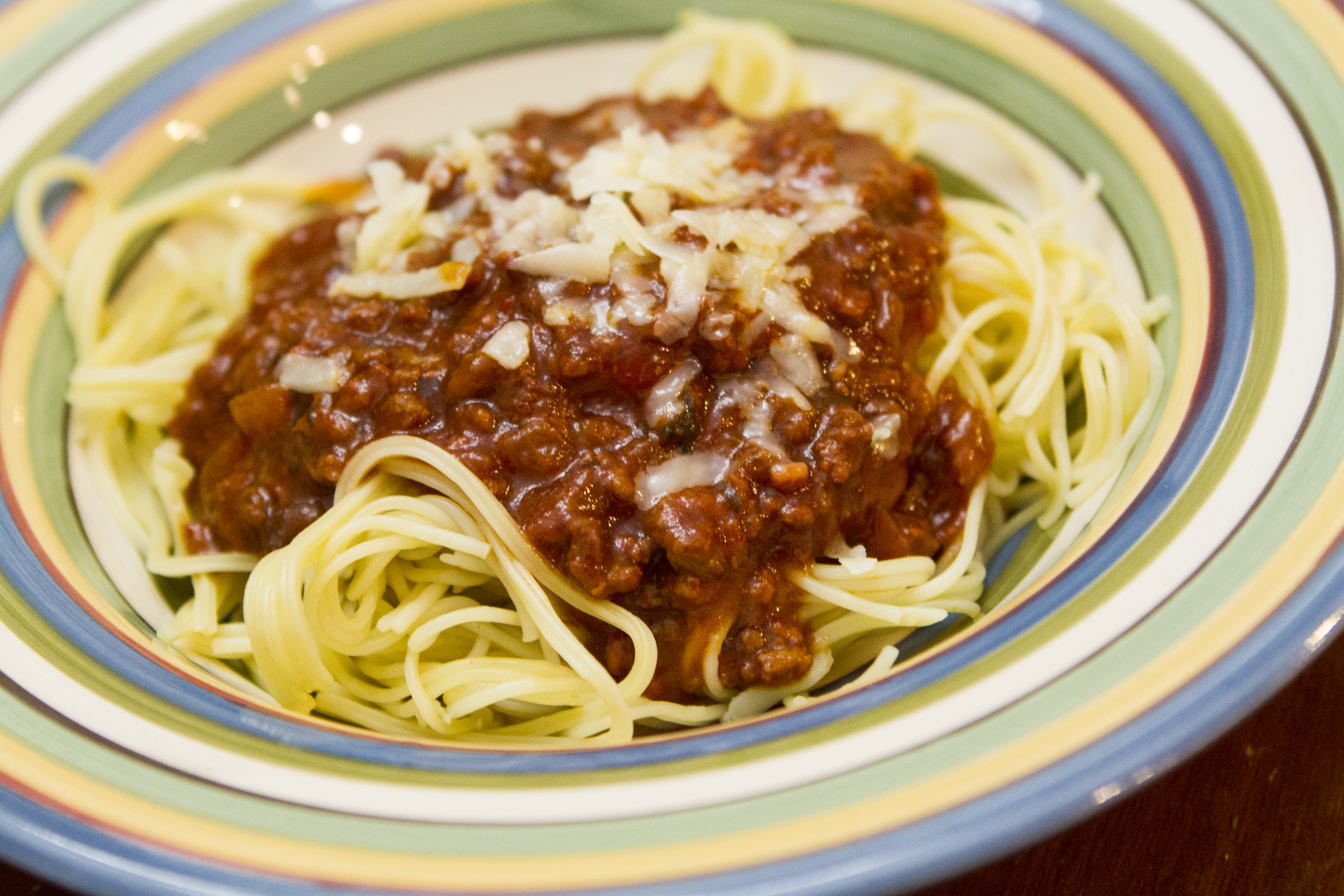
Filipino spaghetti with giniling (ground meat) and grated cheese

Filipino spaghetti is relatively cheap and easy to make, which is part of the reason for its popularity. First, minced garlic and onions are sautéed in oil in a large pan until they caramelize. The giniling (ground meat) is added and cooked until it is brown. The sliced hot dogs are then added, though it can be replaced with other processed meat like smoked longganisa sausages, ham, Vienna sausages, meatballs, luncheon meat, Spam, or corned beef. It is cooked for a few more minutes before the tomato sauce and tomato paste mixture is poured into the pan. Beef stock, mushroom soup, or evaporated milk may also be added. This is sweetened with a bit of banana ketchup or brown sugar, and spiced to taste with salt and black pepper. Other common sweeteners include condensed milk, syrup, or even carbonated soft drinks. It is boiled until it reduces to the right consistency. Some people use store-bought spaghetti sauce as the base for convenience that, in the Philippines, may already be sold in Filipino-style flavors.

The spaghetti pasta noodles are almost always store-bought. They are cooked usually to al dente consistency. They may be added directly to the sauce and pre-mixed, or served separately with a large amount of sauce poured over them. Grated or cubed cheese (usually cheddar) is added before serving, though sometimes the cheese is infused in the sauce or melted over the pasta.

Other ingredients that may be added to the sauce include finely minced red and green bell peppers and carrots.

== Cultural significance ==
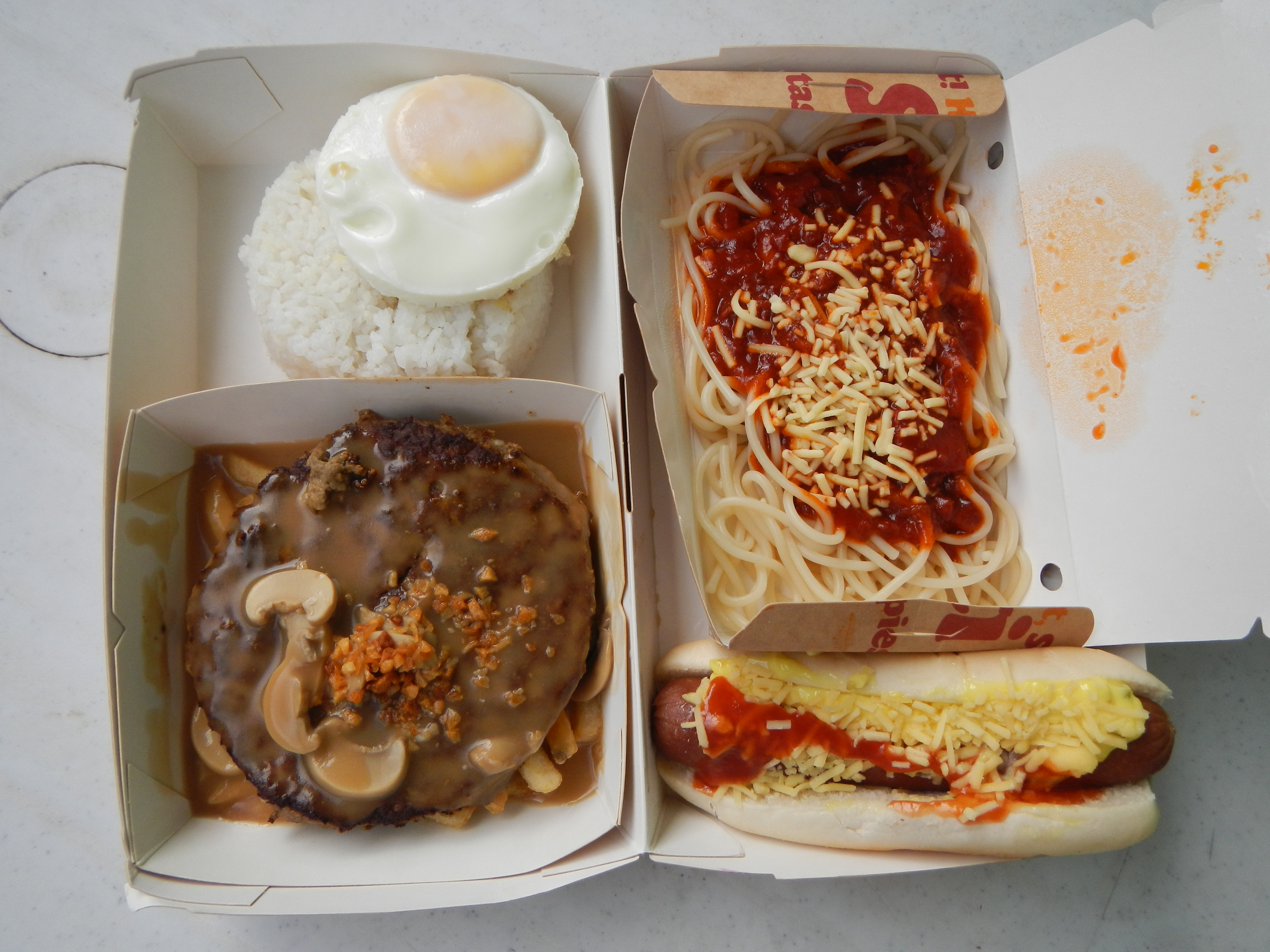
Filipino fastfood fare sold in Jollibee, including Filipino spaghetti

Filipino spaghetti has great cultural significance for Filipinos as a comfort food. It is almost always served on special occasions, especially on children's birthdays.

Filipino spaghetti is offered by fast-food chains in the Philippines. It is part of the regular menu of the Filipino chain Jollibee, as well as the Philippine branches of McDonald's and KFC, among others.

In Nueva Ecija, a similar but distinct dish to Filipino spaghetti is bangus spaghetti, which is made from native milkfish, called bangus in the native language.

== See also ==
- Barbecue spaghetti
- Cincinnati chili, another example of a fusion-cuisine spaghetti dish
- Haitian spaghetti, another fusion-cuisine spaghetti dish
- Baasto, Somali word for pasta, with some dishes being eaten with a banana
- Embutido
- Menudo (stew)
- Naporitan, a similar dish from Japan
- Hawaiian pizza
- Pancit
- Sopas
- SpaghettiOs
