= Half-birthday =

Six months before or after the anniversary of the birth of a person

A half-birthday is a day approximately six months before or after the anniversary of a person's birth. It is sometimes marked by people whose birthday either falls on major holidays, near major holidays, or both, the celebration of which may overshadow celebration of the birthday. It may also be marked by students whose birthday does not occur during the regular school year; a half-birthday allows a celebration with friends at school, with half a cake.

== Calculation ==
There are two ways to calculate half-birthdays.

The easier but less precise method is to take the number of the date of the birthday and advance the month by six: e.g. April 20 becomes October 20. More than 75% of the time this method results in a date that is not exactly half a year away from their birthday. Months don't all have the same number of days, leap years add a day, and the second half of the year is longer than the first half. A good example where this doesn't work is six months after an August 30 birthday would be February 30, which is nonexistent in the Gregorian calendar.

Accurate calculations require the addition or subtraction of half the number of days in a year from the birth date taking into account if the time period includes a leap day or not. In the case of a common year, this would be 182.5 days. In leap years, the number of days would be 183. This method would lead to a March 1 or February 29 half-birthday for an August 31 birthday, depending on whether it's a leap year.

In the U.S., some tax-related penalties are related to half-years, such as a 10% penalty for making an early withdrawal from an IRA before age 59½. The federal government defines the half-year as being "six calendar months" after the anniversary of birth, regardless of what day of the month this produces.

In many states in the U.S., the minimum age to obtain a learner permit occurs on a half-birthday, such as 14½ in Idaho, 14 years and eight months in Michigan, 15½ in California, and 15 years and nine months in Maryland. The same is true for receiving a restricted license for a minor in many states.

== Popular culture ==
At least three children's books have been written about half-birthdays:

- Pomerantz, Charlotte (1984). The Half-Birthday Party. New York: Clarion Books. ISBN 0-89919-273-4.
- Martin, Ann (1996). Karen's Half Birthday. New York: Scholastic. ISBN 0-590-69186-4.
- Graham, Bob (2005). Oscar's Half Birthday. Cambridge: Candlewick Press. ISBN 0-7636-2699-6.

Mentions in TV Series

- "GREY'S ANATOMY – S17E08 – IT'S ALL TOO MUCH [TRANSCRIPT]". He brought gelato to every birthday. And every half-birthday. Which all three of these kids now think is an actual thing.

== See also ==
- Unbirthday
- Birthday
