= Poorman's Meal =

American Depression-era dish

Poorman's Meal is a classic American Depression-era dish consisting of fried potatoes and slices of hot dogs.

The Poorman's Meal was popularized by Clara Cannucciari, who lived during the Great Depression, remembered the dish, and made popular videos about it.

This food is easy to make, and consists of a few inexpensive ingredients. It is made by cutting potatoes into small pieces, and frying them in a pan with onions, with added tomato sauce and some water, and later hot dog slices.

== See also ==
- Hot dog
- Haitian spaghetti
