= Haitian spaghetti =

Breakfast dish of noodles and hot dogs

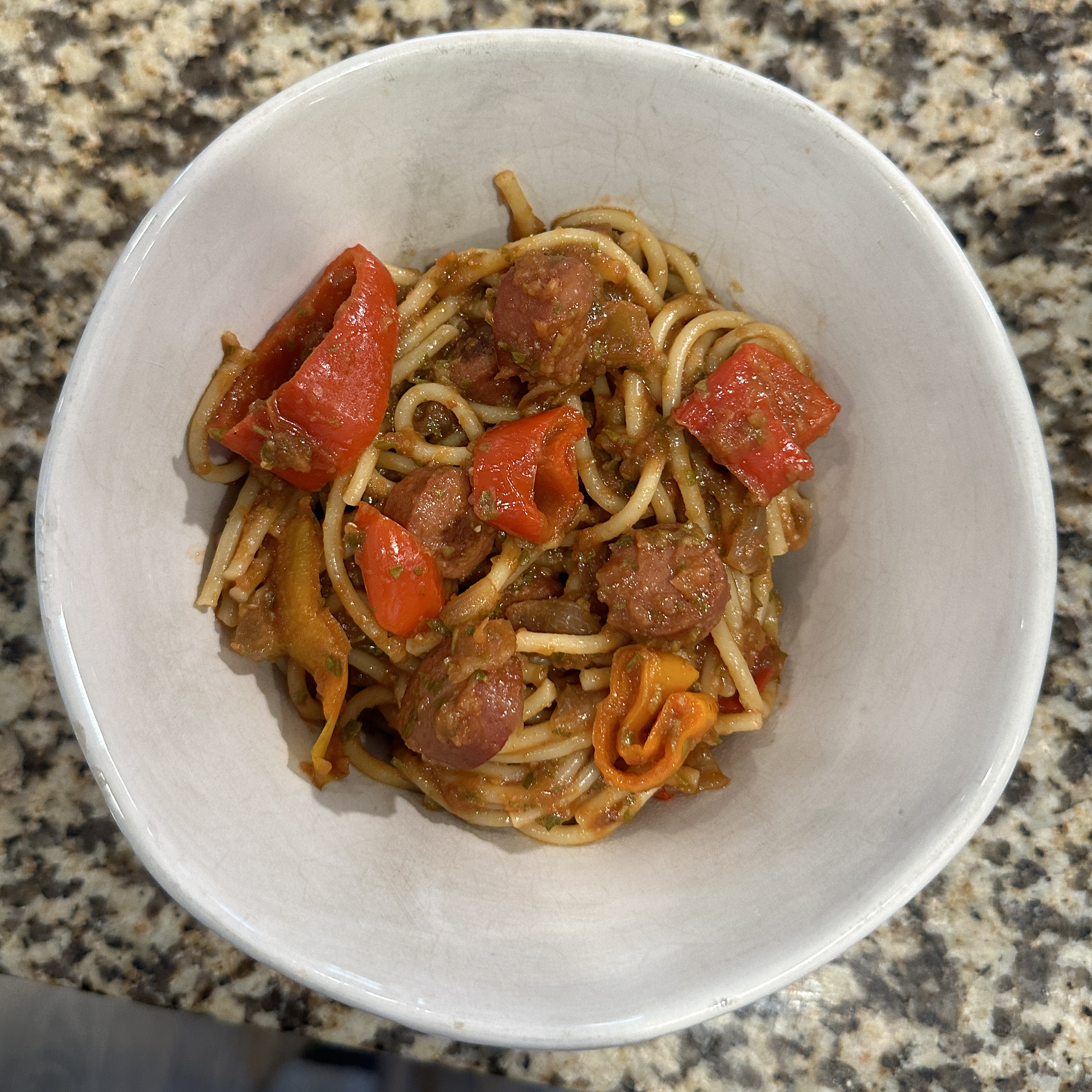
- Place of origin: Haiti
- Main ingredients: Spaghetti, hot dogs, epis, tomato sauce
- Ingredients generally used: chili peppers, onions

Haitian spaghetti (sometimes espageti, espaghetti, spaghetti a l'hatienne or espageti ayisyen) is a dish of Haitian cuisine typically served for breakfast. It typically consists of spaghetti noodles and hot dogs in a sauce made from ketchup and epis.

== Ingredients and preparation ==
The dish typically combines epis with tomato paste or ketchup to make a sauce in which spaghetti noodles are tossed. Typically sliced hot dogs are included. Onions, garlic and peppers are common inclusions. Vienna sausage or herring is occasionally used in place of hot dogs.. Haitian spaghetti isn't a single standardized dish—it's one of those recipes that varies significantly by region, household, and personal preference. Many recipes also include thyme, butter, evaporated milk, and bouillon cube (often chicken or vegetable) for added richness and savory flavor. It's common to serve it with boiled eggs, avocado, fried sweet plantain, ripe banana, chopped parsley, and basil, though these are optional and depend on family tradition.

Preparation
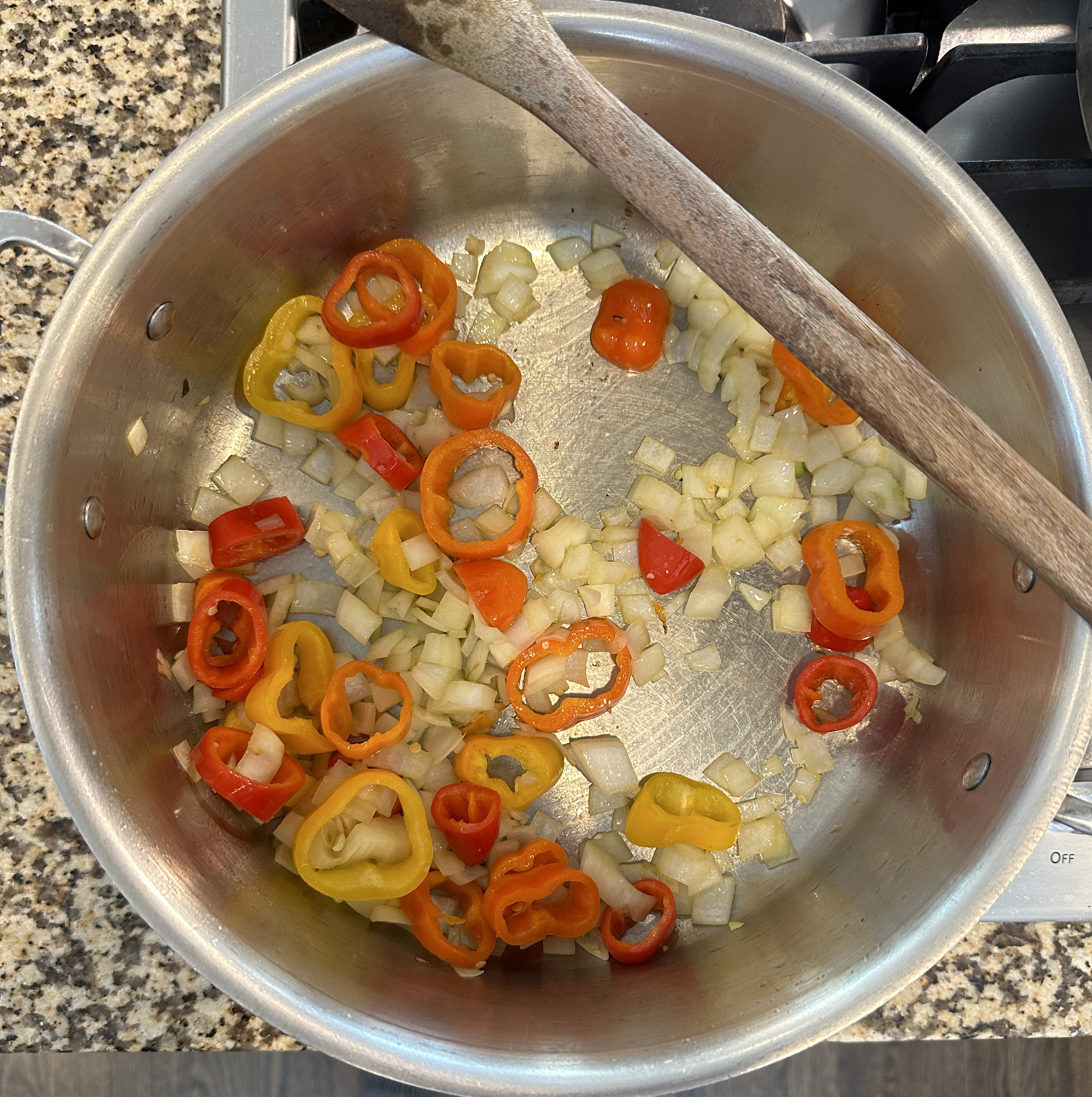
Sauteeing onions and peppers

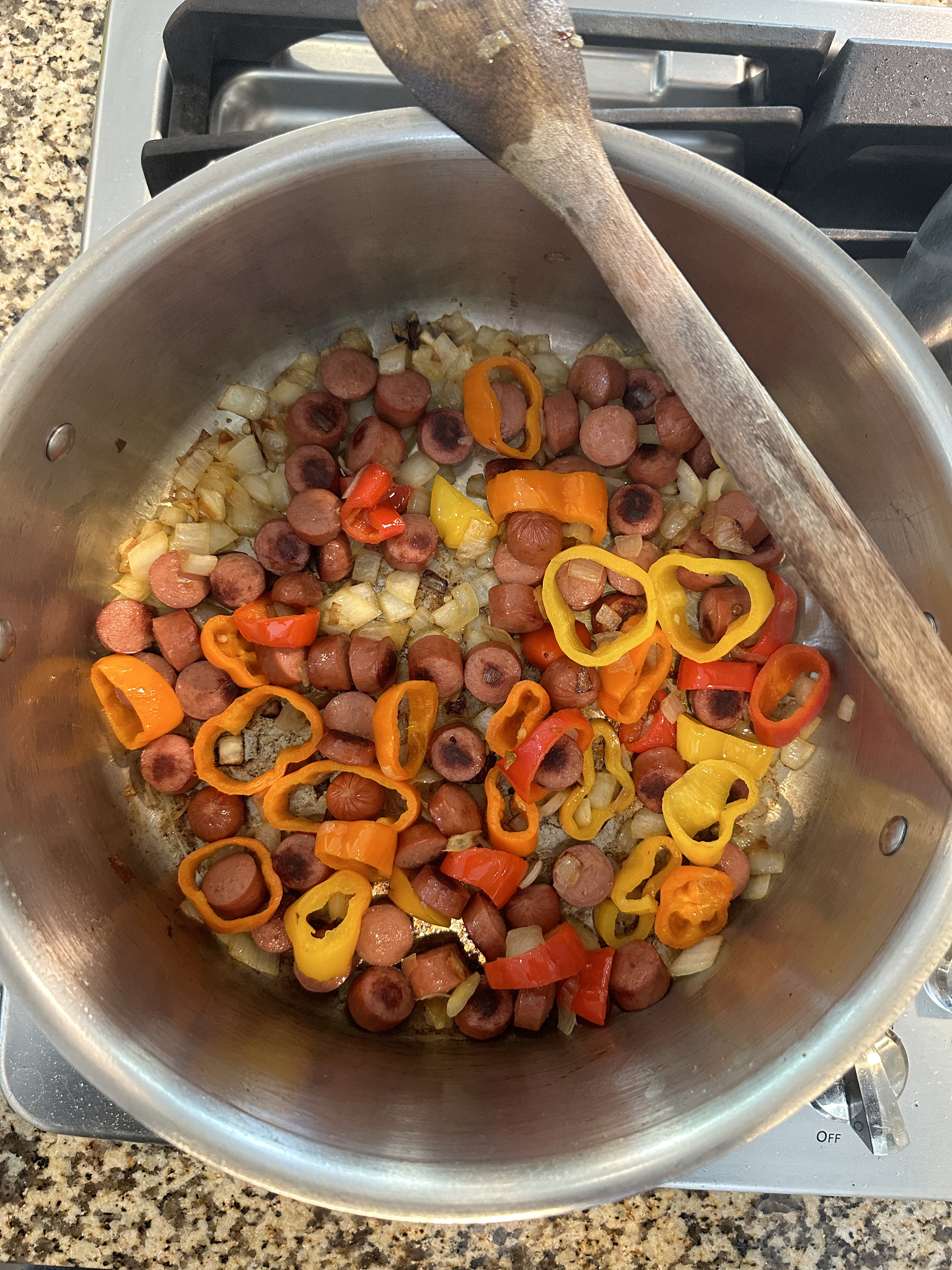
Adding hot dogs and browning

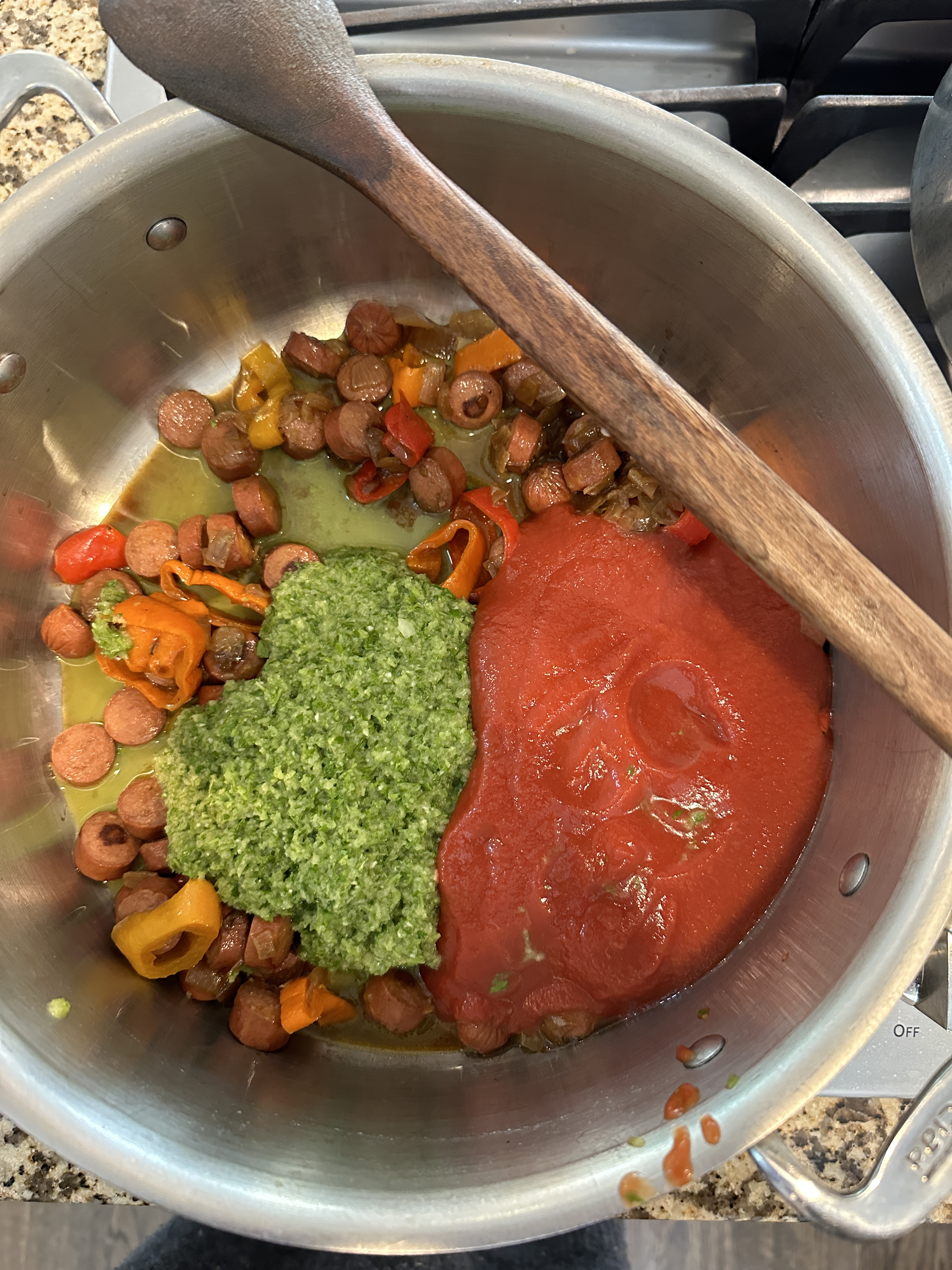
Adding epis and tomato sauce

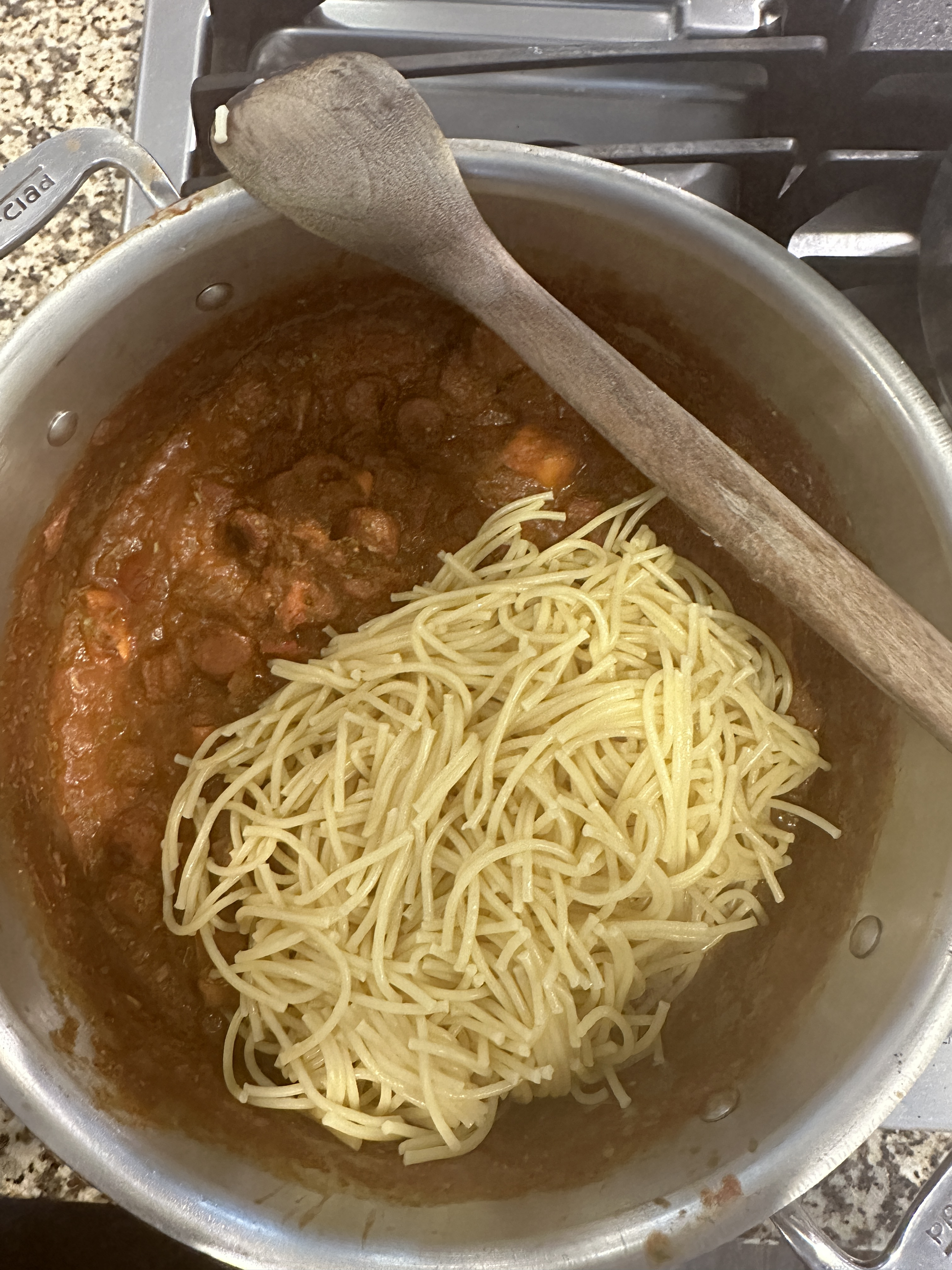
Adding cooked spaghetti and sauteeing to reduce

== History ==
The dish was developed during the period of US occupation from 1915 to 1934, when American foods such as hot dogs and ketchup were introduced to Haiti. It is considered a comfort food.

== Serving ==
It is a common breakfast dish. According to Eater in 2017, it was not a common item on restaurant menus, but was becoming more common and was available from street vendors.

== Fusion spaghetti dishes ==
- Barbecue spaghetti
- Cincinnati chili
- Filipino spaghetti

== See also ==
- List of pasta dishes
- Poorman's Meal
