= Barbecue spaghetti =

American pasta dish

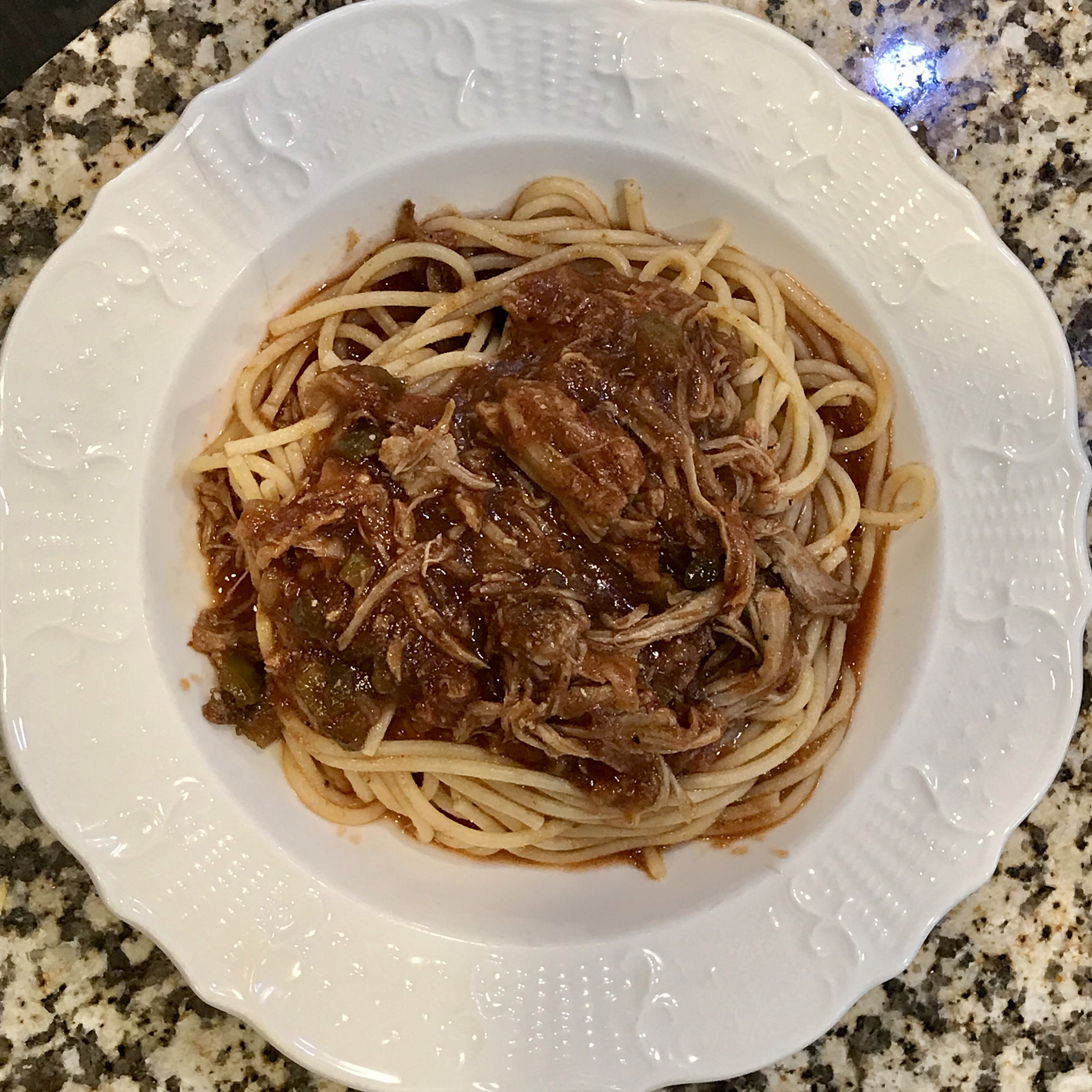
- Place of origin: Memphis, Tennessee, US
- Created by: Brady Vincent
- Main ingredients: Spaghetti, barbecue sauce, pulled or smoked pork
- Ingredients generally used: green peppers, onions
- Similar dishes: Cincinnati chili, Filipino spaghetti

Barbecue spaghetti is a dish from Memphis, Tennessee, that combines spaghetti with a sauce made from shredded smoked pork or pulled pork, vegetables, and barbecue sauce. It is served as a side dish in some Memphis barbecue restaurants. Southern Living called the dish iconic and "perhaps the city's most unusual creation". HuffPost called it "a Memphis staple".

== Preparation and serving ==
Barbecue spaghetti can be made with pulled pork or shredded smoked pork. The sauce is "half marinara and half barbecue sauce", sometimes with onions and peppers included, and is simmered before adding the pork; the consistency is close to that of barbecue sauce. The spaghetti is cooked until soft, then tossed in the hot sauce. This dish is served as a side.

== History ==
The dish was invented by former railroad cook Brady Vincent, who opened a barbecue restaurant called Brady and Lil's. In 1980 Frank and Hazel Vernon bought the restaurant and renamed it The Bar-B-Q Shop. Frank Vernon said the food originated in the early 1960s.

Vincent also taught the recipe for barbecue spaghetti to Jim Neely, who opened Interstate Bar-B-Q in the late 1970s; Interstate modified the sauce recipe by adding the "extra back flap meat" from a rack of ribs and cooking it in a pot with peppers and onions.

State Park restaurant in Cambridge, Massachusetts, serves a "Memphis BBQ spaghetti" that uses pulled pork in a marinara that uses a barbecue sauce as its base.

== Similar dishes ==
According to John Shelton Reed, "Barbecue spaghetti is to spaghetti Bolognese as Cincinnati chili is to the Tex-Mex variety".

Filipino spaghetti is spaghetti noodles in tomato sauce mixed with banana ketchup or other sweetener, topped with hot dogs and cheese.

== See also ==
- List of foods of the Southern United States
- List of pasta dishes
- List of pork dishes
- List of regional dishes of the United States
- Culture of Memphis, Tennessee
- Cincinnati chili, another example of a fusion-cuisine spaghetti dish
- Filipino spaghetti, another example of a fusion-cuisine spaghetti dish
- Haitian spaghetti, another example of a fusion-cuisine spaghetti dish
