= Clara Cannucciari =

American YouTuber and chef (1915–2013)

- Born: Cologira Bonfanti; August 18, 1915; Melrose Park, Illinois, U.S.
- Died: November 29, 2013 (aged 98); Skaneateles, New York, U.S.
- Occupations: Web series host and author
- Years active: 2007–2011
- Spouse: Dino Cannucciari (m. 1943; died 1992)
- Children: 1

Cologira "Clara" Cannucciari (née Bonfanti; August 18, 1915 – November 29, 2013) was an American YouTuber and chef who served as the host of the web series Great Depression Cooking with Clara and author of the book Clara's Kitchen.

== Biography ==
Born in Melrose Park, Illinois, on August 18, 1915, Cannucciari went on to live through North America's Great Depression. During the economic hardships of the Great Depression, Clara's recently immigrated Sicilian American parents, Giuseppe and Giuseppina Bonfanti, were particularly affected by the financial instability that swept across North America. Due to these challenges, her mother maintained frugal methods to sustain the household.

In 2007, her grandson Christopher Cannucciari began filming Clara preparing her mother's Depression meals and assembled the footage into the YouTube series Great Depression Cooking with Clara. She retired shortly after her 96th birthday and her last video was posted on April 18, 2019 (Fried Fish). But activities on the channel had since been renewed as her grandson Christopher announced on March 25, 2020, that he'd be uploading more videos of his late grandma onto her YouTube channel.

== Death ==
Cannucciari died November 29, 2013, aged 98. She is survived by her daughter-in-law, four grandchildren and three great-grandchildren.

Her son, Carl, died in 1992 aged 42.

== See also ==
- Poorman's Meal
