= Unbirthday =

Neologism by Lewis Carroll

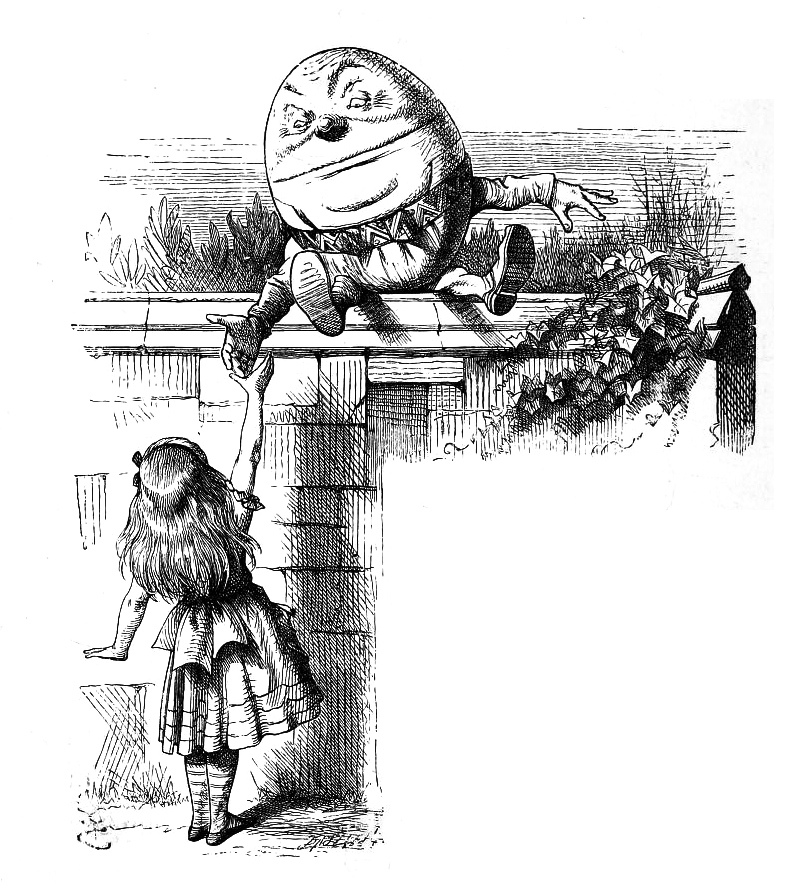
Humpty Dumpty wearing the cravat he received as an unbirthday present from the White King and Queen. From Through the Looking-Glass, illustration by John Tenniel.

An unbirthday (originally written un-birthday) is an event celebrated on all days of the year which are not a person's birthday. It is a neologism which first appeared in Lewis Carroll's 1871 novel Through the Looking-Glass. The concept gave rise to "The Unbirthday Song" in the 1951 animated feature film Alice in Wonderland.

In Through the Looking-Glass, Humpty Dumpty is wearing a cravat (which Alice at first mistakes for a belt) which he says was given to him as an "un-birthday present" by the White King and Queen. He then has Alice calculate the number of unbirthdays in a year.

In the Disney animated film Alice in Wonderland, Alice stumbles upon the Mad Hatter, the March Hare and the Dormouse having an unbirthday party and singing "The Unbirthday Song" (music and lyrics by Mack David, Al Hoffman and Jerry Livingston). Alice at first does not understand what an unbirthday is; when the Mad Hatter explains it to her, she realises it is her unbirthday as well, and receives an unbirthday cake from the Mad Hatter. The scene from the film combines the idea of an unbirthday introduced in Through the Looking-Glass with the "Mad Tea Party" described in Alice's Adventures in Wonderland. Later in the film; the Mad Hatter mentions this unbirthday party when he is summoned as a witness at Alice's trial. The King of Hearts realises that it is the Queen of Hearts' unbirthday as well, and the trial is abruptly halted for celebration.

The unbirthday party is also the subject of a 1951 comic released to coincide with the film. The comic version is substantially longer (32 pages) than the scene in the animated film, and has Alice being invited to the unbirthday party of Tweedledum and Tweedledee (who are not actually present at the unbirthday party). Humpty Dumpty is a character in the comic version, although not in the manner in which he appears in Through the Looking-Glass.
