= Birthday =

Anniversary of the birth of a person (or an institution)

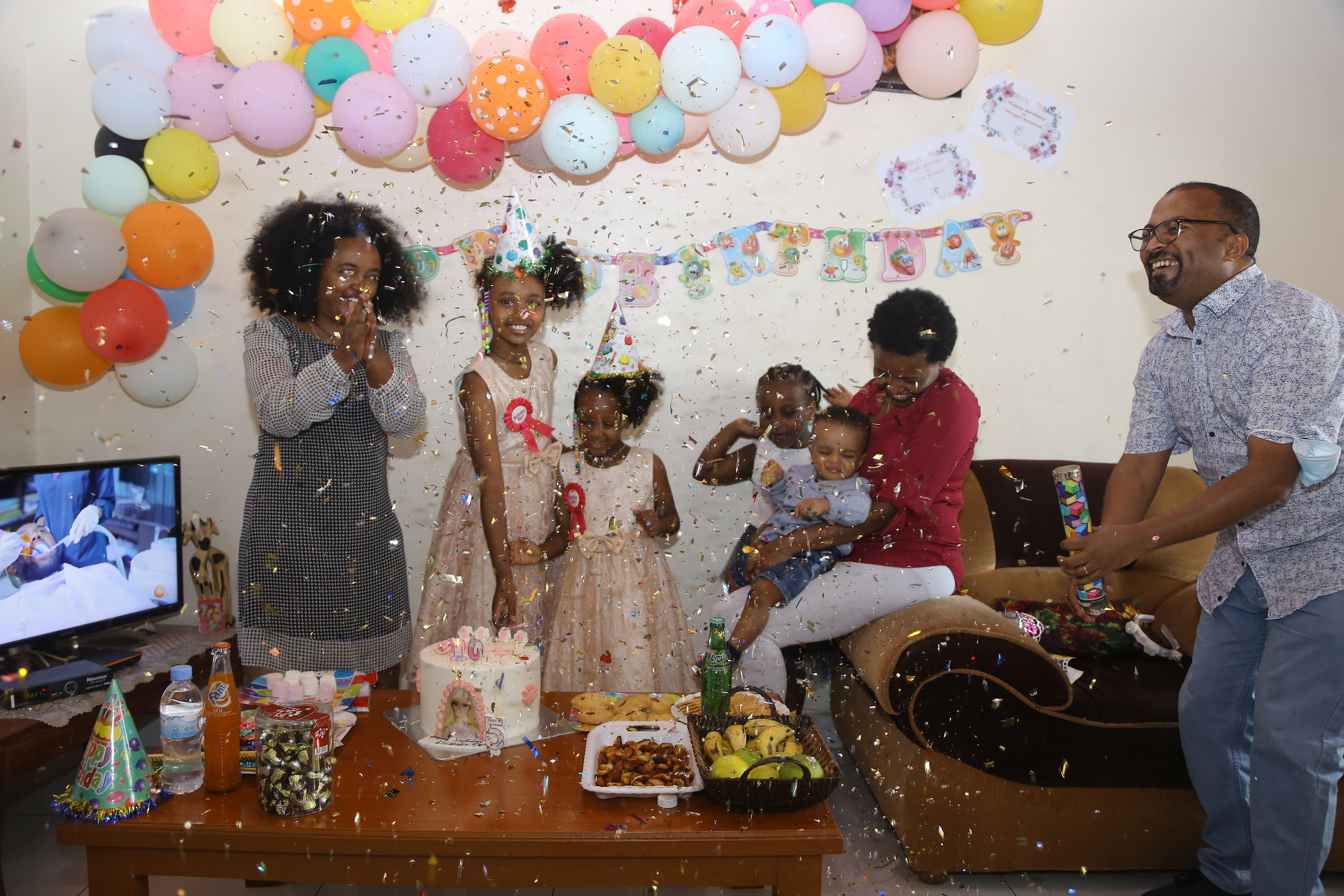
A Rwandan family celebrating a birthday at home in 2021, during the COVID-19 pandemic

A birthday is the anniversary of the birth of a person or the figurative birth of an institution. Birthdays of people are celebrated in numerous cultures, often with birthday gifts, birthday cards, a birthday party, or a rite of passage.

Many religions celebrate the birth of their founders or religious figures with special holidays (e.g. Christmas, Mawlid, Buddha's Birthday, Krishna Janmashtami, and Gurpurb).

There is a distinction between birthday and birthdate (also known as date of birth): the former, except for February 29, occurs each year (e.g. January 15), while the latter is the complete date when a person was born (e.g. January 15, 2001).

== Coming of age ==
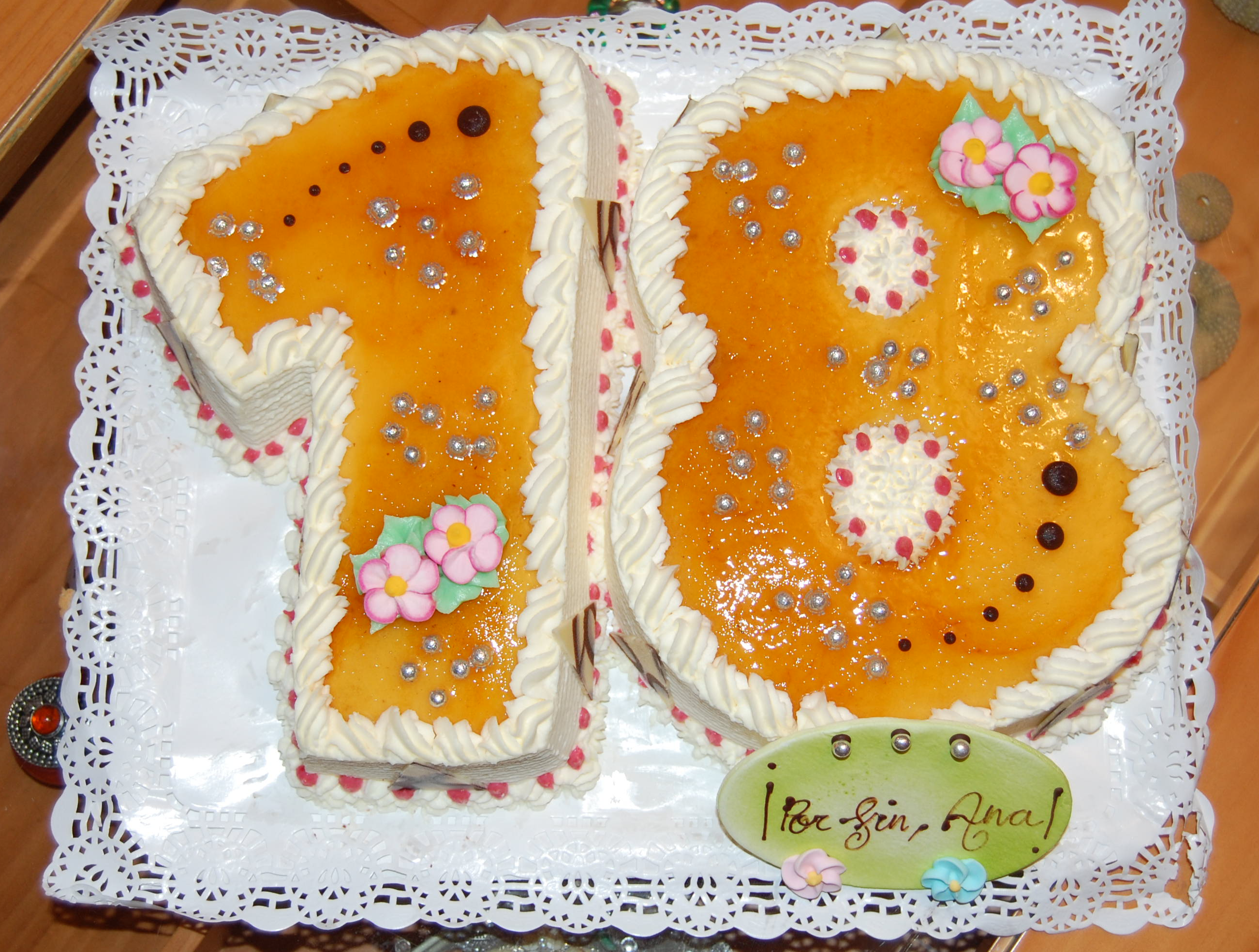
Cake for an 18th birthday

In most legal systems, one becomes a legal adult on a particular birthday when they reach the age of majority (usually between 12 and 21), and reaching age-specific milestones confers particular rights and responsibilities. At certain ages, one may become eligible to leave full-time education, become subject to military conscription or to enlist in the military, to consent to sexual intercourse, to marry with parental consent, to marry without parental consent, to vote, to run for elected office, to legally purchase (or consume) alcohol and tobacco products, to purchase lottery tickets, or to obtain a driver's licence. The age of majority is when minors cease to legally be considered children and assume control over their persons, actions, and decisions, thereby terminating the legal control and responsibilities of their parents or guardians over and for them. Most countries set the age of majority at 18, though it varies by jurisdiction.

Many cultures celebrate a coming of age birthday when a person reaches a particular year of life.

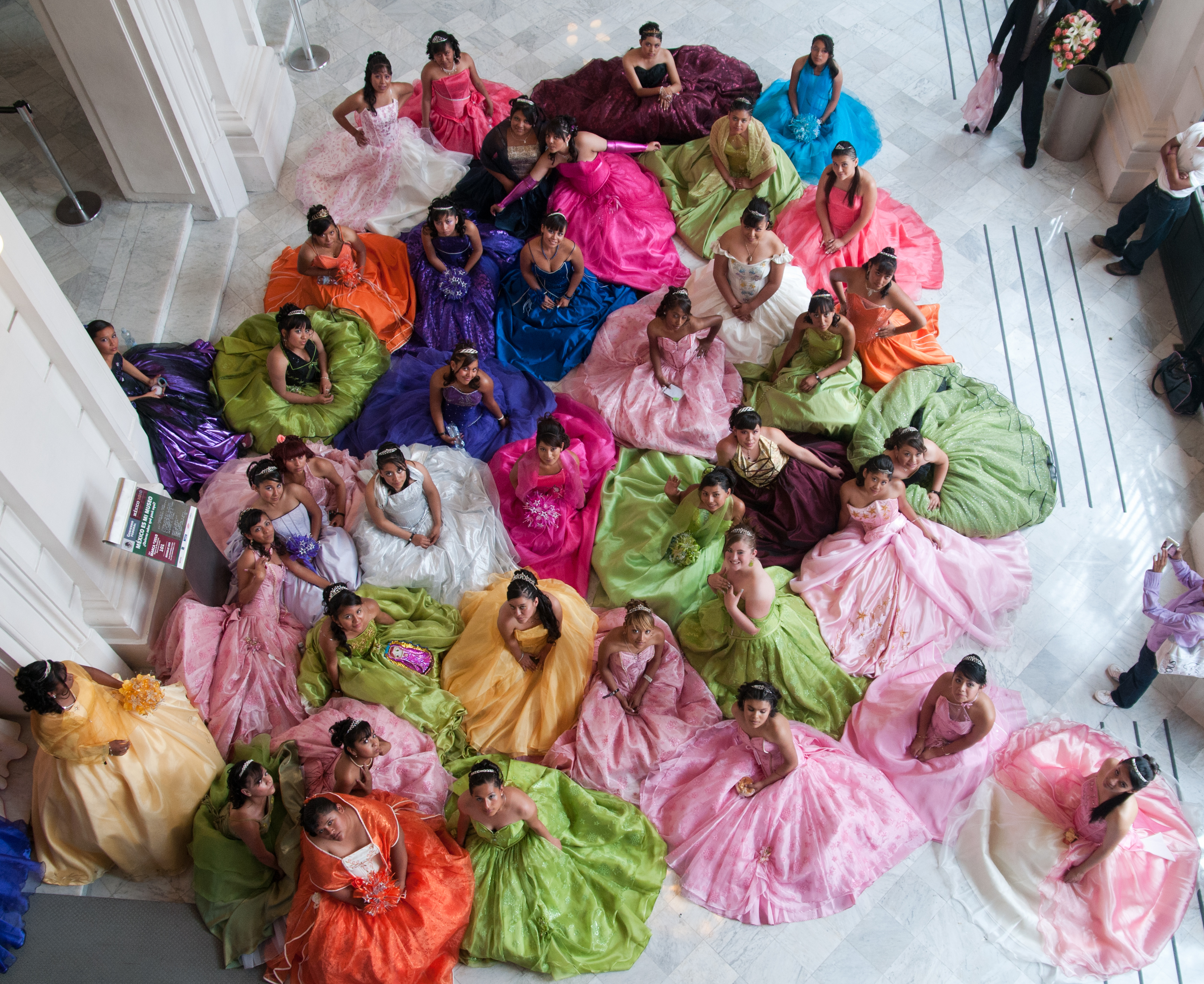
Young women attired for quinceañera in Mexico City

- In Canada and the United States, families often mark a girl's 16th birthday with a "sweet sixteen" celebration – often represented in popular culture.
- In some Hispanic countries, as well as Brazil, the quinceañera (Spanish) or festa de quinze anos (Portuguese) celebration traditionally marks a girl's 15th birthday.
- In Japan, people celebrate Coming of Age Day for all those who have turned 18.
- In the Philippines, a coming-of-age party called a debut is held for young women on their 18th birthday and young men on their 21st birthday.
- Jewish boys have a bar mitzvah on their 13th birthday. Jewish girls have a bat mitzvah on their 12th birthday, or sometimes on their 13th birthday in Reform and Conservative Judaism. This marks the transition where they become obligated in commandments from which they were previously exempted and are counted as part of the community.

=== Other landmark birthdays ===
Some cultures celebrate landmark birthdays in early life or old age.

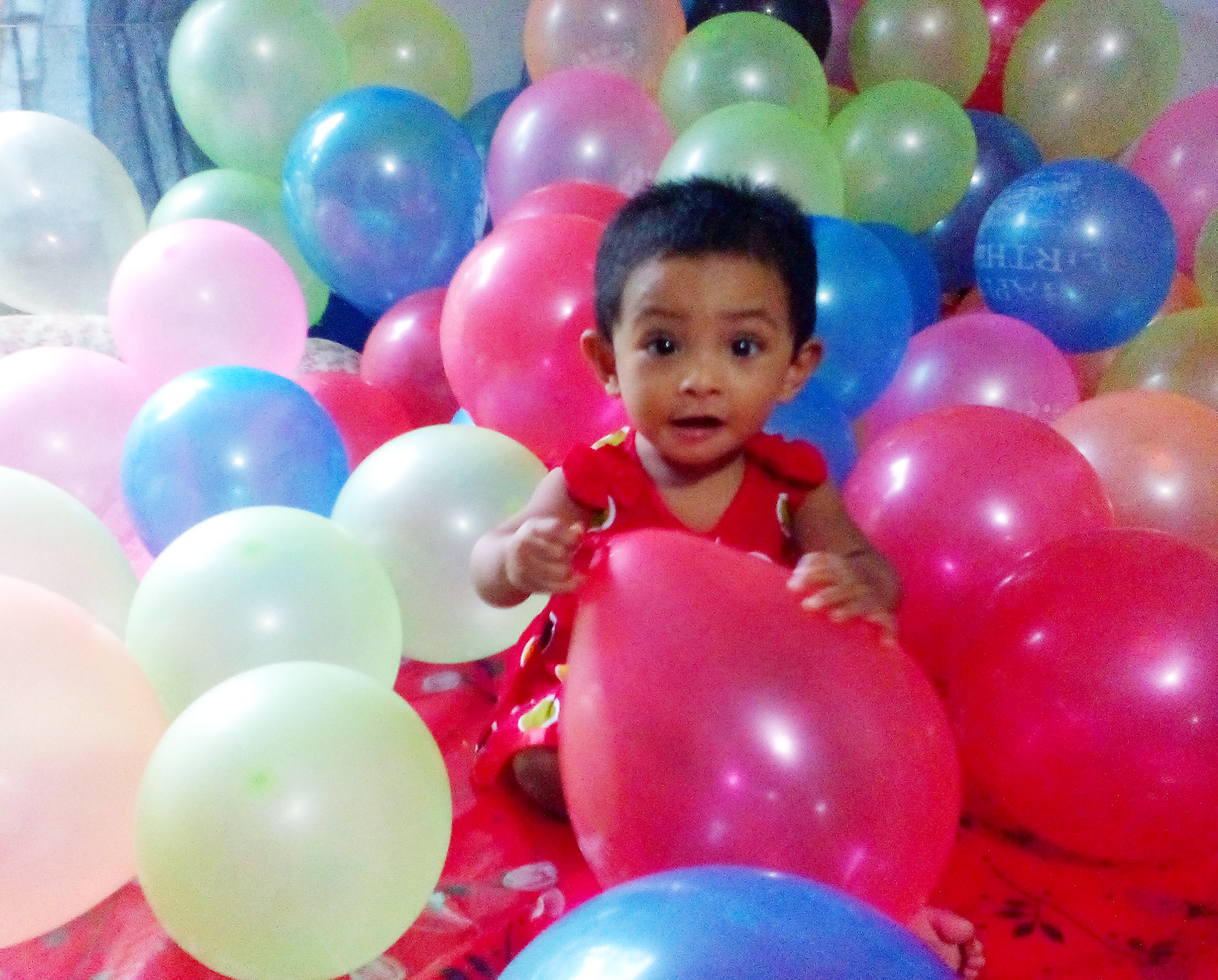
A one-year-old girl playing with her birthday balloons in Bangladesh

- In Korea, many celebrate a traditional ceremony of Baek-il (Feast for the 100th day) and Doljanchi (child's first birthday).
- In some Asian countries that follow the zodiac calendar, there is a tradition of celebrating the 60th birthday.
- In British Commonwealth nations, cards from the Royal Family are sent to those celebrating their 100th and 105th birthdays and every year thereafter.

In many cultures and jurisdictions, if a person's real birthday is unknown (for example, if they are an orphan), their birthday may be adopted or assigned to a specific day of the year, such as January 1. Racehorses are reckoned to become one year old in the year following their birth on January 1 in the Northern Hemisphere and August 1 in the Southern Hemisphere.

== Birthday parties ==
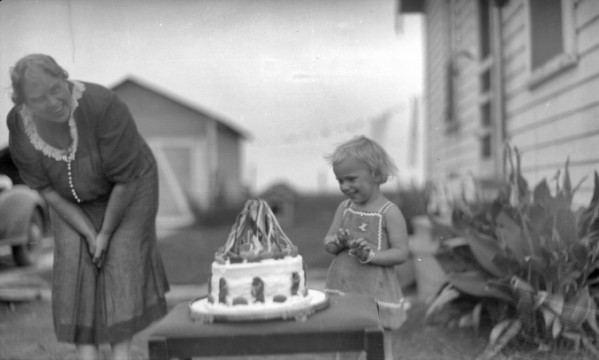
Child with Snow White cake, c. 1910–1940

A voicemail from a child wishing his mother a happy birthday

In certain parts of the world, an individual's birthday is celebrated by a party featuring a specially made cake. Presents are bestowed on the individual by the guests appropriate to their age. Other birthday activities may include entertainment (sometimes by a hired professional, i.e., a clown, magician, or musician) and a special toast or speech by the birthday celebrant. The last stanza of Patty Hill's and Mildred Hill's famous song, "Good Morning to You" (unofficially titled "Happy Birthday to You") is typically sung by the guests at some point in the proceedings. In some countries, a piñata takes the place of a cake.

=== Birthday cake ===
The birthday cake may be decorated with lettering and the person's age, or studded with the same number of lit candles as the age of the individual. The celebrated individual may make a silent wish and attempt to blow out the candles in one breath; if successful, superstition holds that the wish will be granted. In many cultures, the wish must be kept secret or it will not "come true".

Birthday cakes

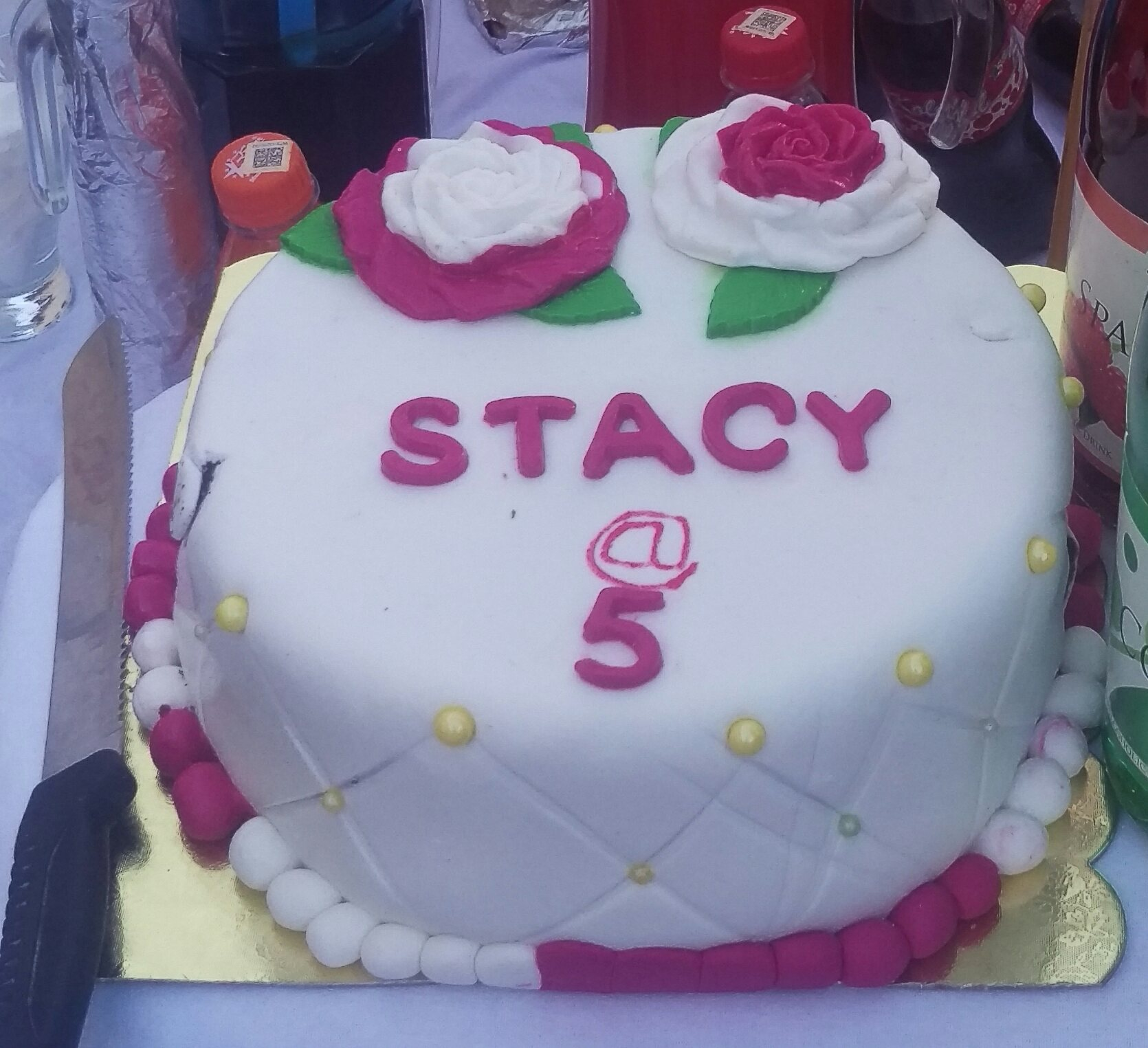
Birthday cake with name and age

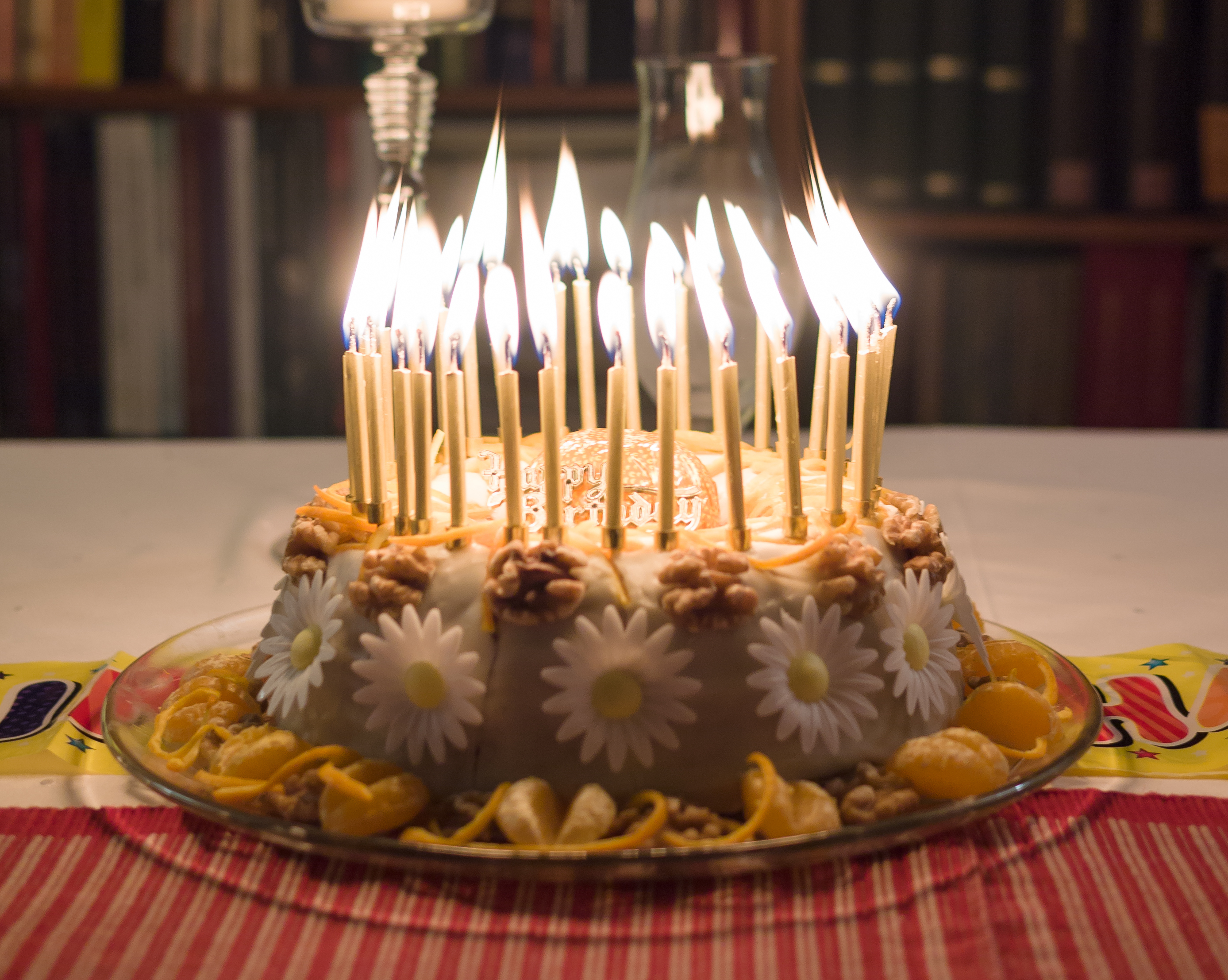
Birthday cake with lit candles

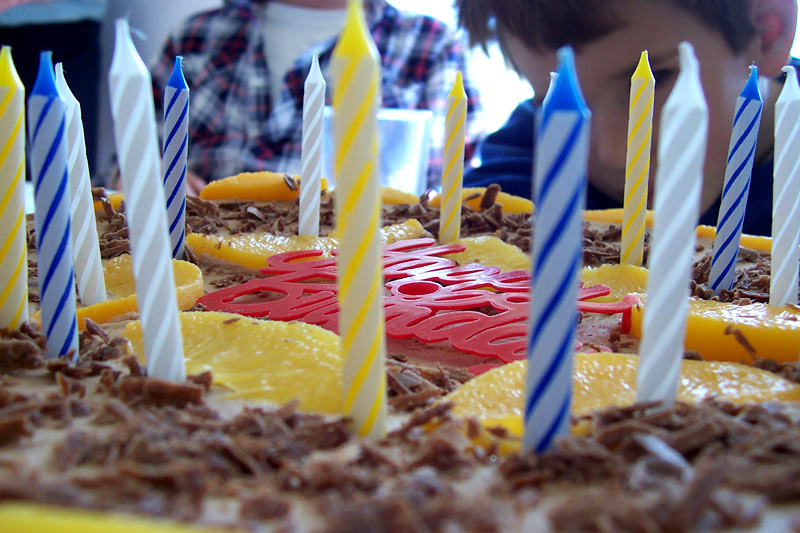
Candles before lighting

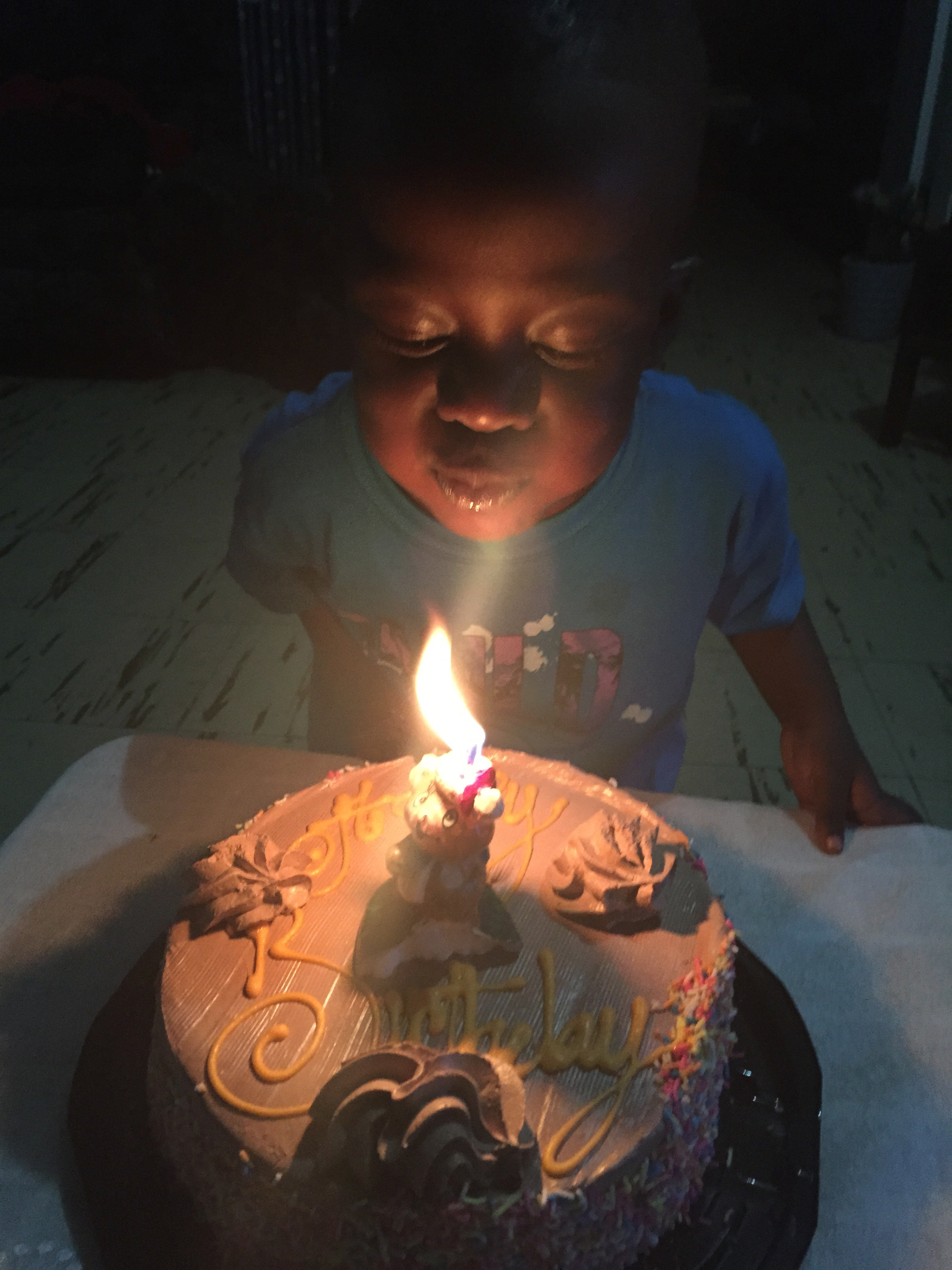
A boy blowing out his candle

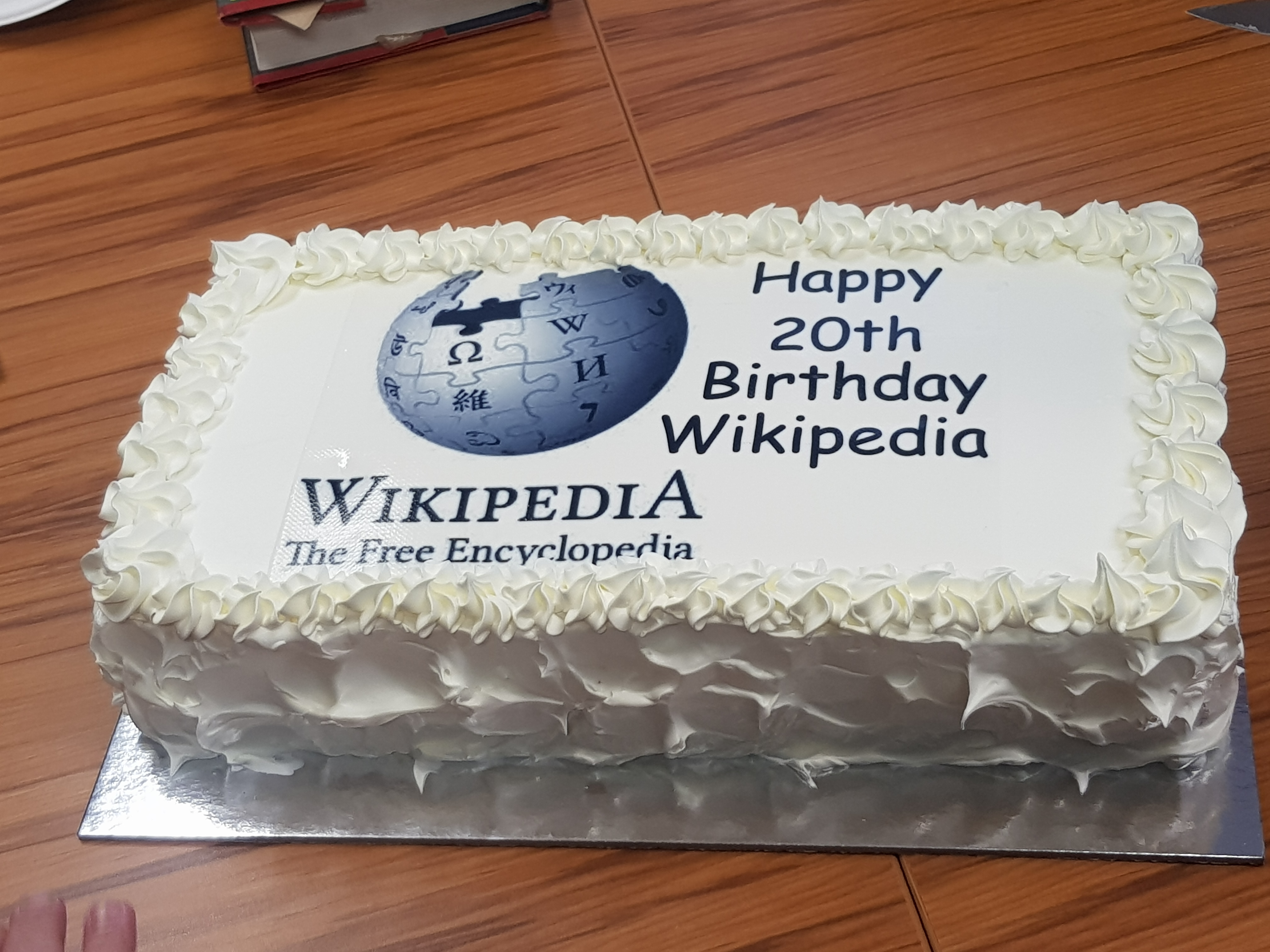
Wikipedia birthday cake
Birthday customs

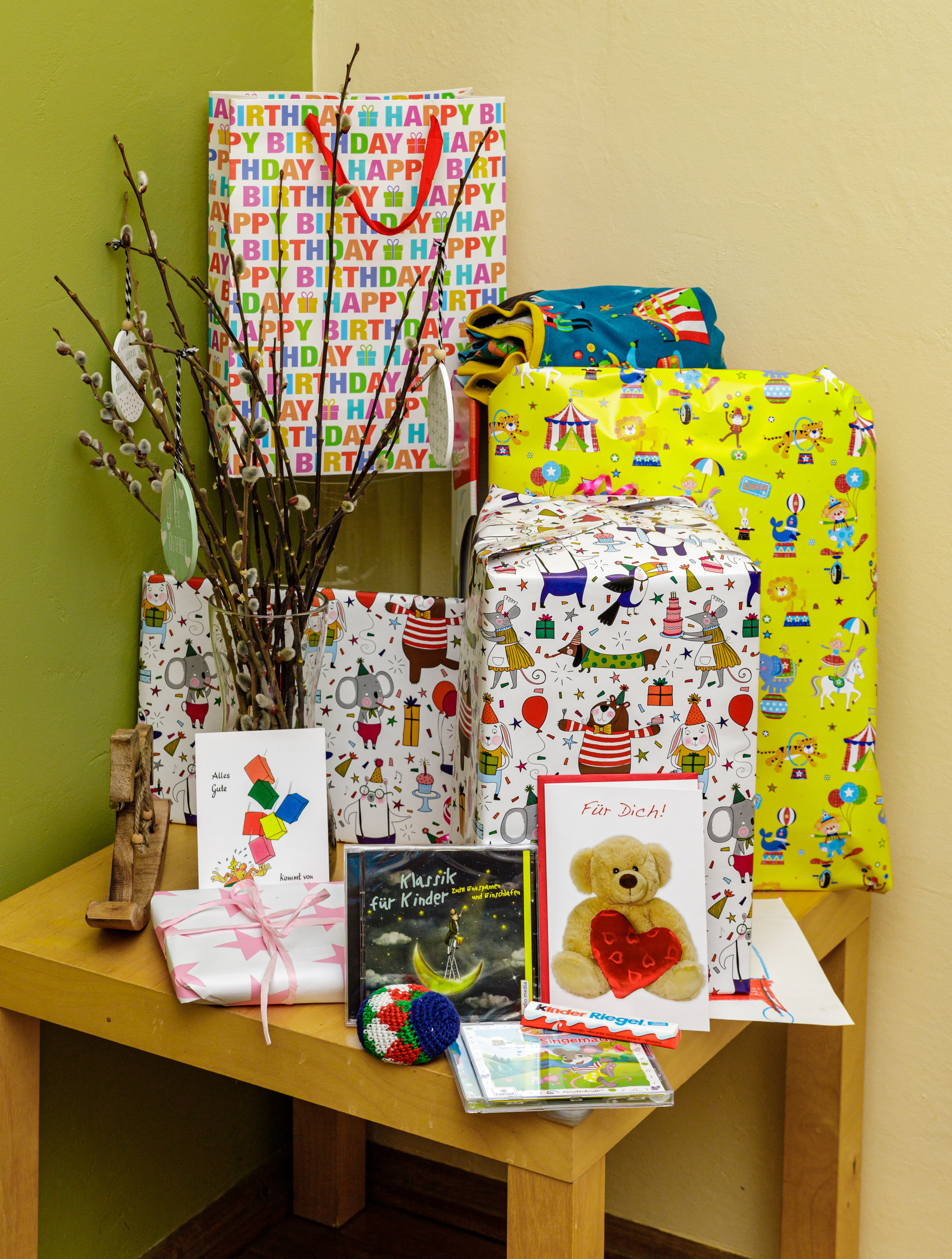
Cards and gifts

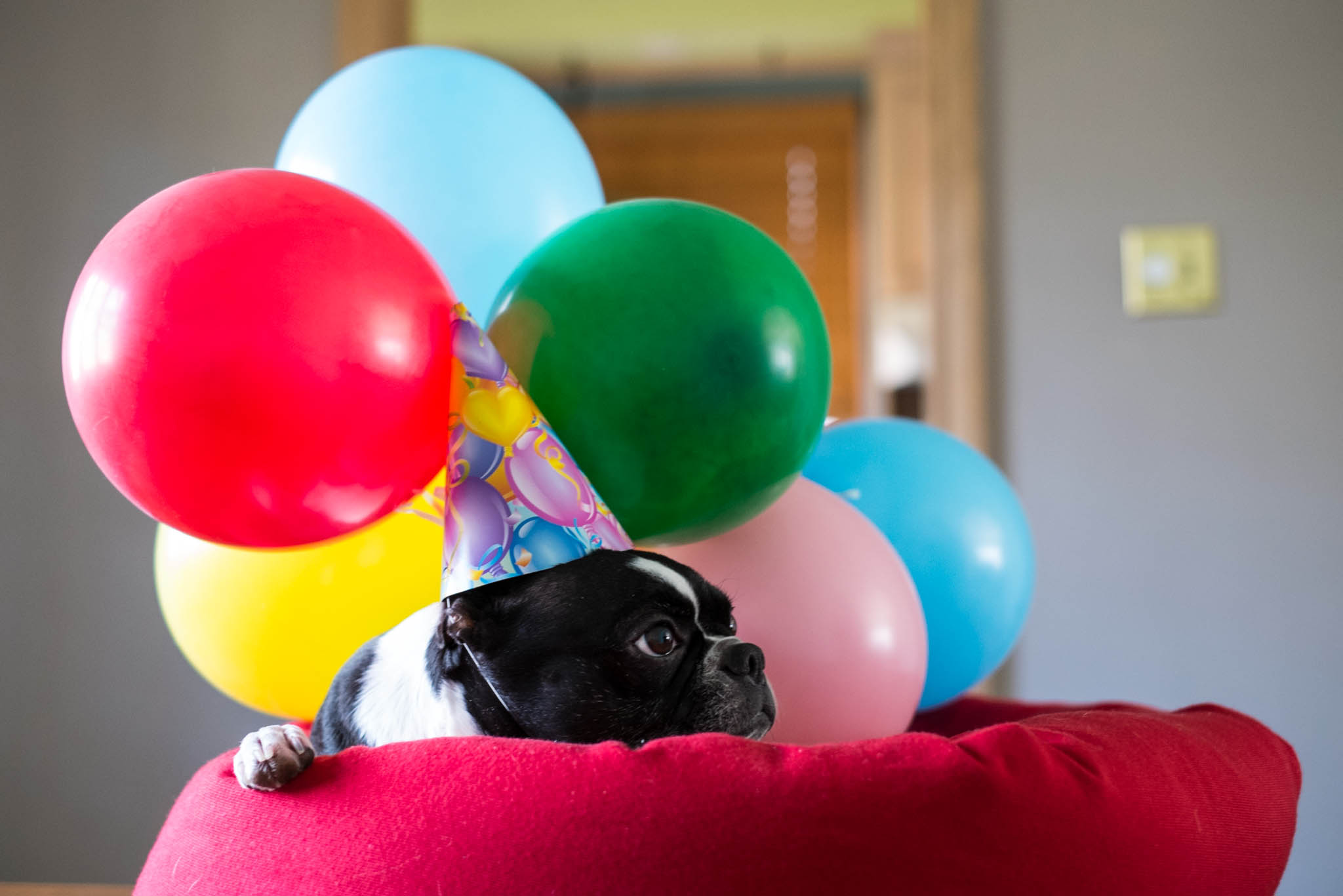
Birthday hat on a dog

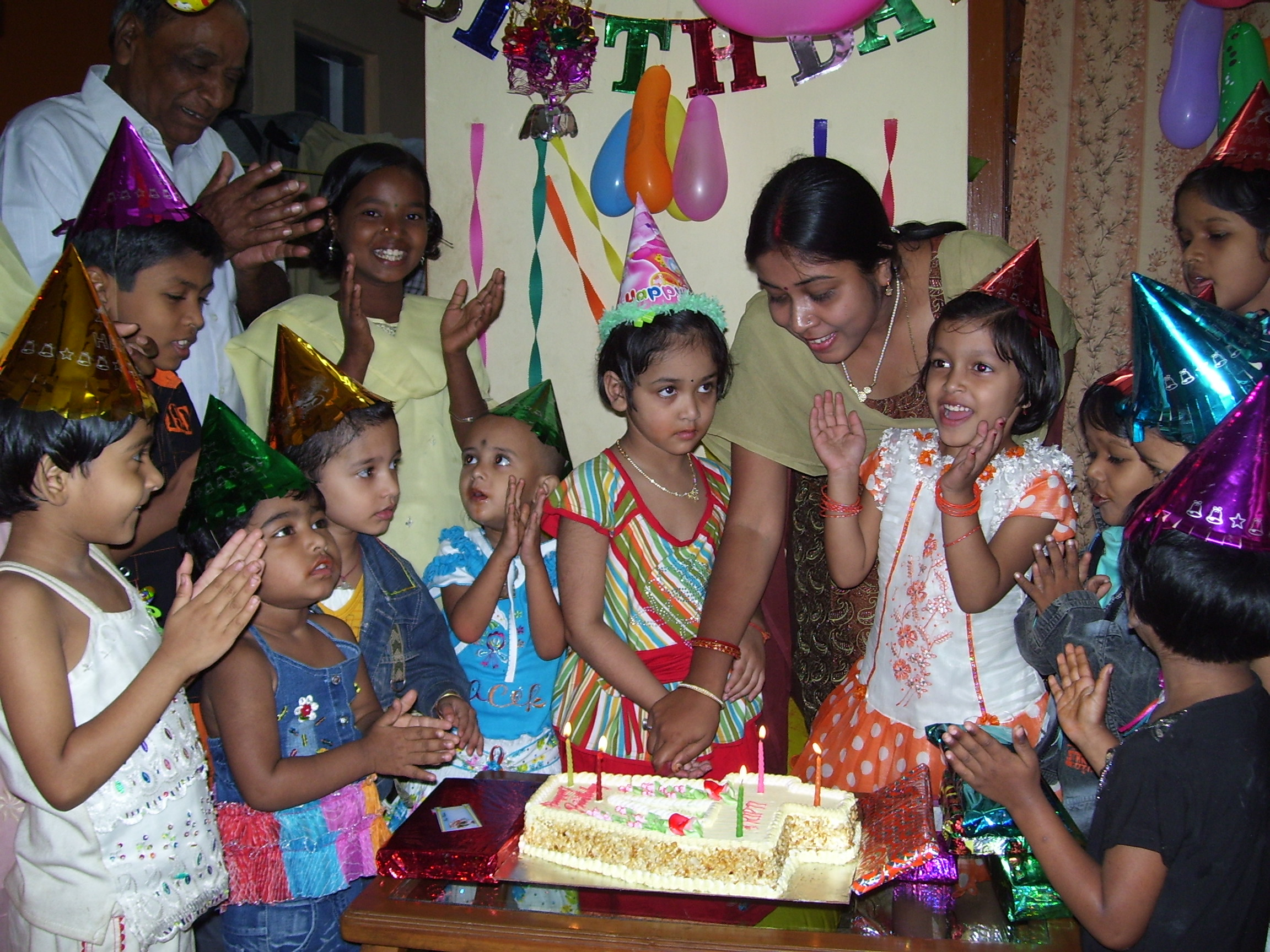
Birthday party for children

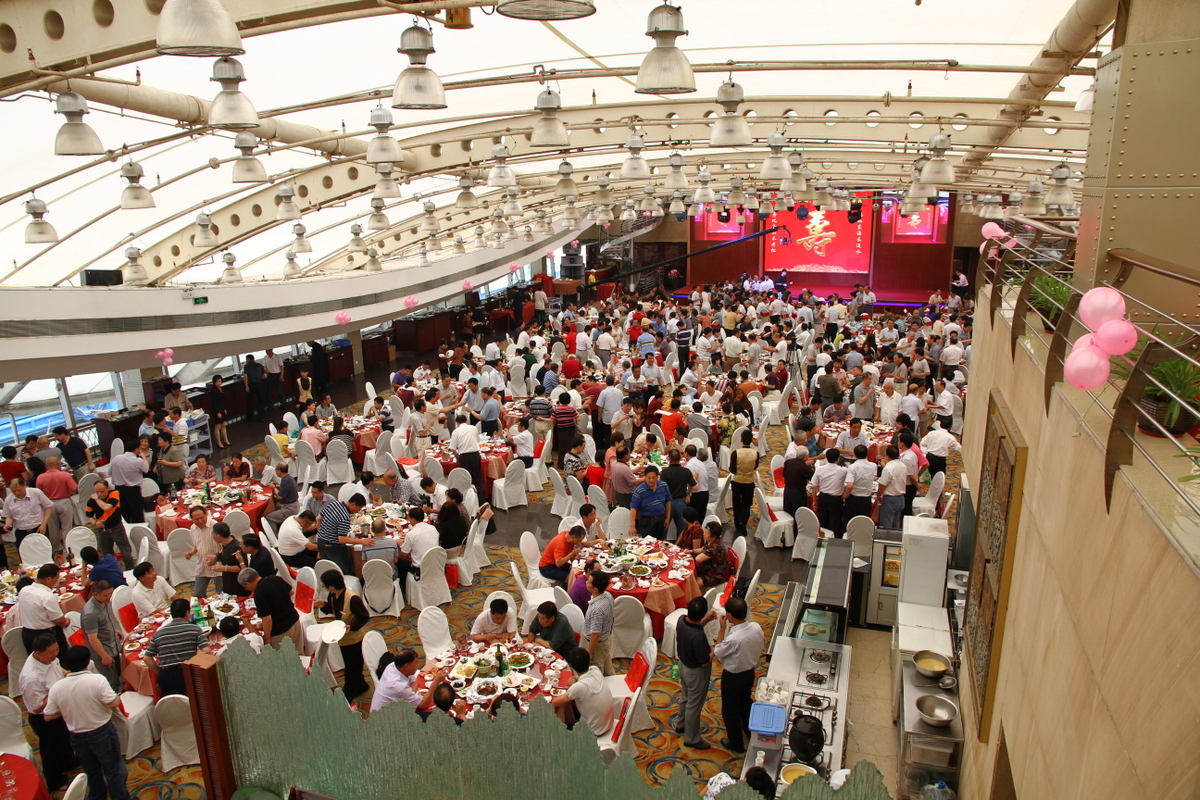
Chinese birthday banquet for an elder with "Longevity" banner

== Birthdays as holidays ==
Historically significant people's birthdays, such as national heroes or founders, are often commemorated by an official holiday marking the anniversary of their birth. Some notables, particularly monarchs, have an official birthday on a fixed day of the year, which may not necessarily match the day of their birth, but on which celebrations are held.

- In India, Gandhi Jayanti, the birthday of Mahatma Gandhi is an annual holiday celebrated on October 2. All liquor shops are closed across the country in honor of Gandhi, who did not consume liquor.
- The King's (or Queen's) Official Birthday in Australia, Fiji, Canada, New Zealand, and the United Kingdom.
- The Grand Duke's Official Birthday in Luxembourg is typically celebrated on June 23. This is different from the monarch's date of birth, November 11.

Koninginnedag in Amsterdam, 1932

- Koninginnedag in the Kingdom of the Netherlands was typically celebrated on April 30. Queen Beatrix fixed it on her mother's birthday, the previous queen, to avoid the winter weather associated with her own birthday in January. The present monarch's birthday is April 27, and it is also celebrated on that day. This has replaced the celebration of Koninginnedag on April 30.
- The birthday of Hirohito (Emperor Shōwa) of Japan was April 29, which was celebrated as the Emperor's Birthday. After his death, the holiday was kept as "Shōwa no Hi", or "Shōwa Day". This holiday falls close to Golden Week, the week in late April and early May.
- Kim Il Sung and Kim Jong Il's birthdays are celebrated in North Korea as national holidays called the Day of the Sun and the Day of the Shining Star respectively.
- In the United States, Washington's Birthday, commonly referred to as Presidents' Day, is a federal holiday observing the birthday of George Washington on the third Monday of February each year. Washington's actual birth date was either February 11 (Old Style) or February 22 (New Style). Martin Luther King Jr. Day is a federal holiday observed on the third Monday of January each year to mark the birthday of Martin Luther King Jr. on January 15.

=== Birthdays of religious figures ===
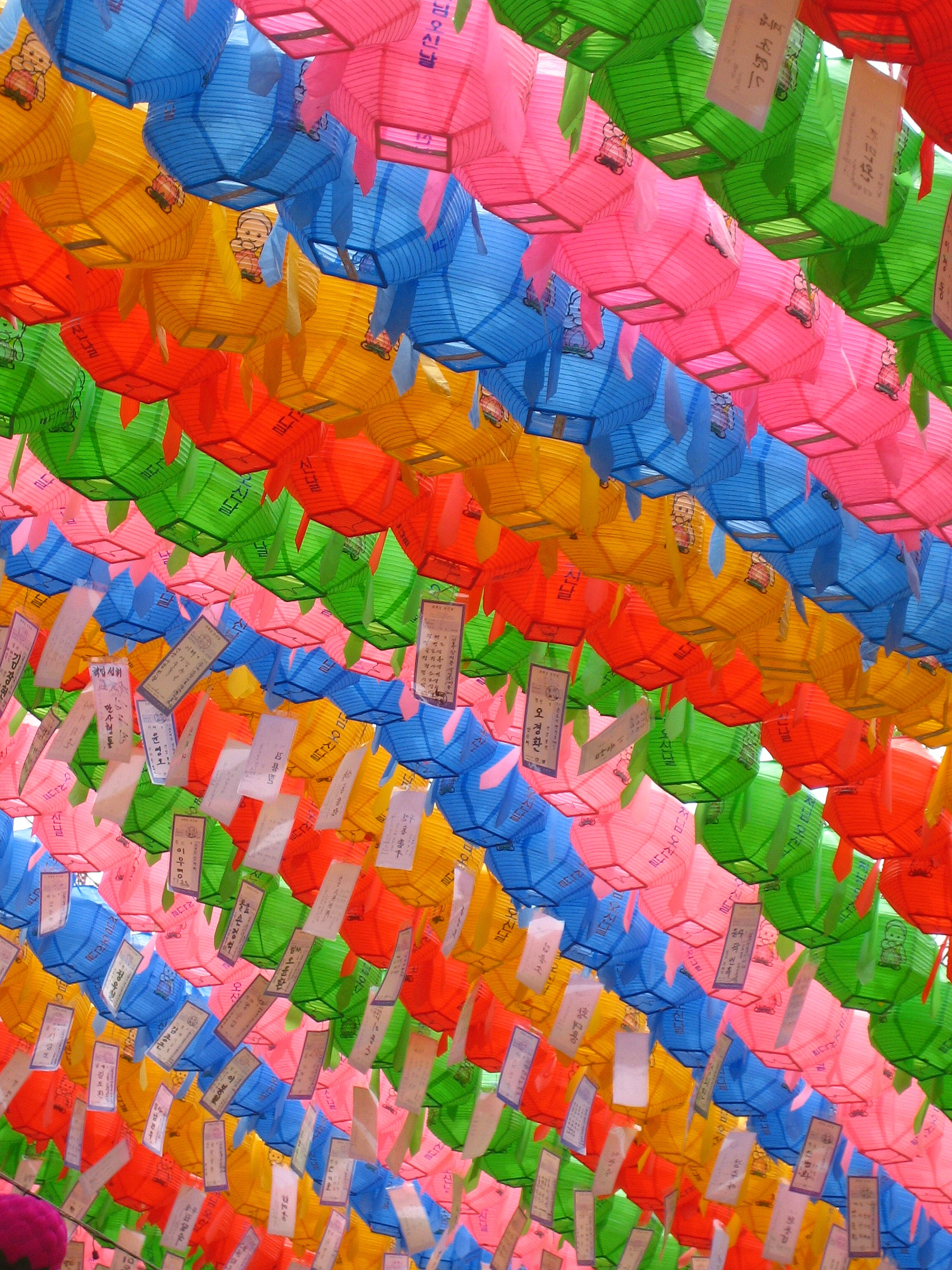
Colored lanterns celebrating the Buddha's birthday at the Lotus Lantern Festival in Seoul

==== Buddha ====
In Mahayana Buddhism, many monasteries celebrate the anniversary of Buddha's birth, usually in a highly formal, ritualized manner. They treat Buddha's statue as if it was Buddha himself as if he were alive; bathing, and "feeding" him.

==== Jesus and Christian saints ====
Jesus Christ's traditional birthday is celebrated as Christmas Eve or Christmas Day around the world, on December 24 or 25, respectively. As some Eastern churches use the Julian calendar, December 25 will fall on January 7 in the Gregorian calendar. These dates are traditional and have no connection with Jesus's actual birthday, which is not recorded in the Gospels.

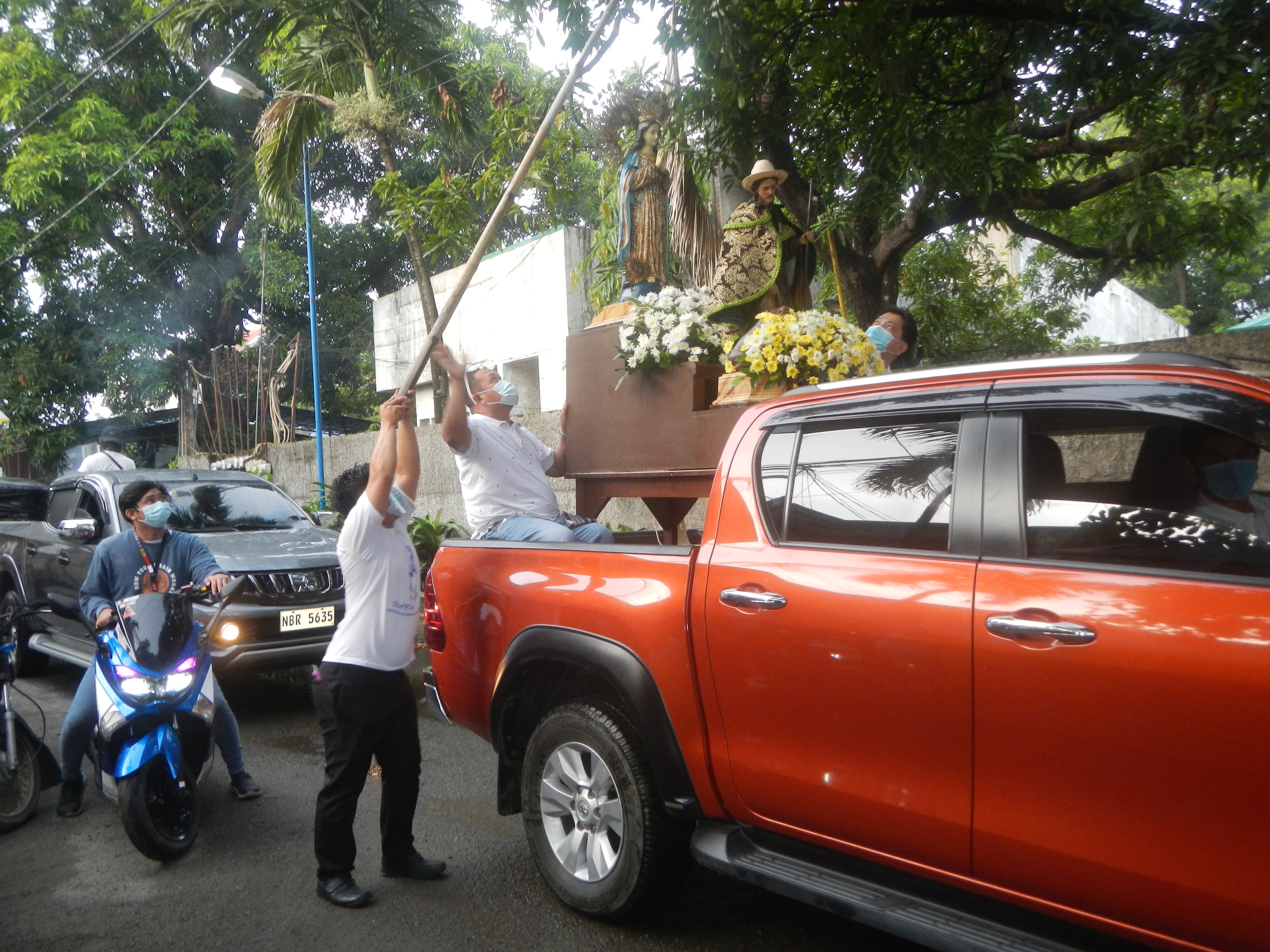
Preparations for a motorcade procession to celebrate the Nativity of Mary during the COVID-19 pandemic in Baliuag, Philippines

Similarly, the birthdays of the Virgin Mary and John the Baptist are liturgically celebrated on September 8 and June 24, especially in the Roman Catholic and Eastern Orthodox traditions (although for those Eastern Orthodox churches using the Julian calendar the corresponding Gregorian dates are September 21 and July 7 respectively). As with Christmas, the dates of these celebrations are traditional and probably have no connection with the actual birthdays of these individuals. Catholic saints are remembered by a liturgical feast on the anniversary of their "birth" into heaven a.k.a. their day of death.

==== Ganesha ====
In Hinduism, Ganesh Chaturthi is a festival celebrating the birth of the elephant-headed deity Ganesha in extensive community celebrations and at home. Figurines of Ganesha are made for the holiday and are widely sold.

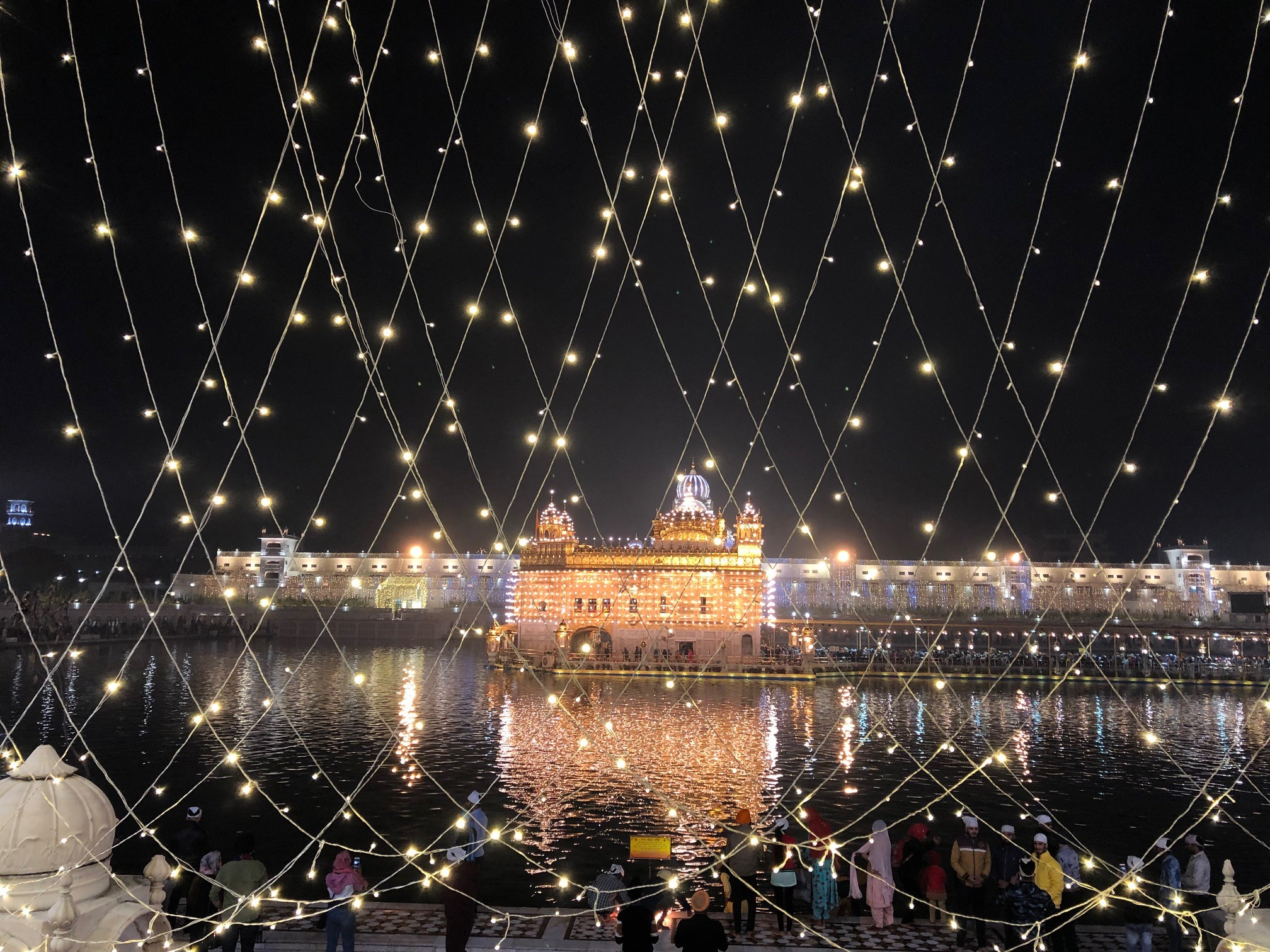
The Golden Temple during Gurpurb celebrations

==== Sikh gurus ====
Sikhs celebrate the anniversary of the birth of Guru Nanak and other Sikh gurus, which is known as Gurpurb.

==== Muhammad ====
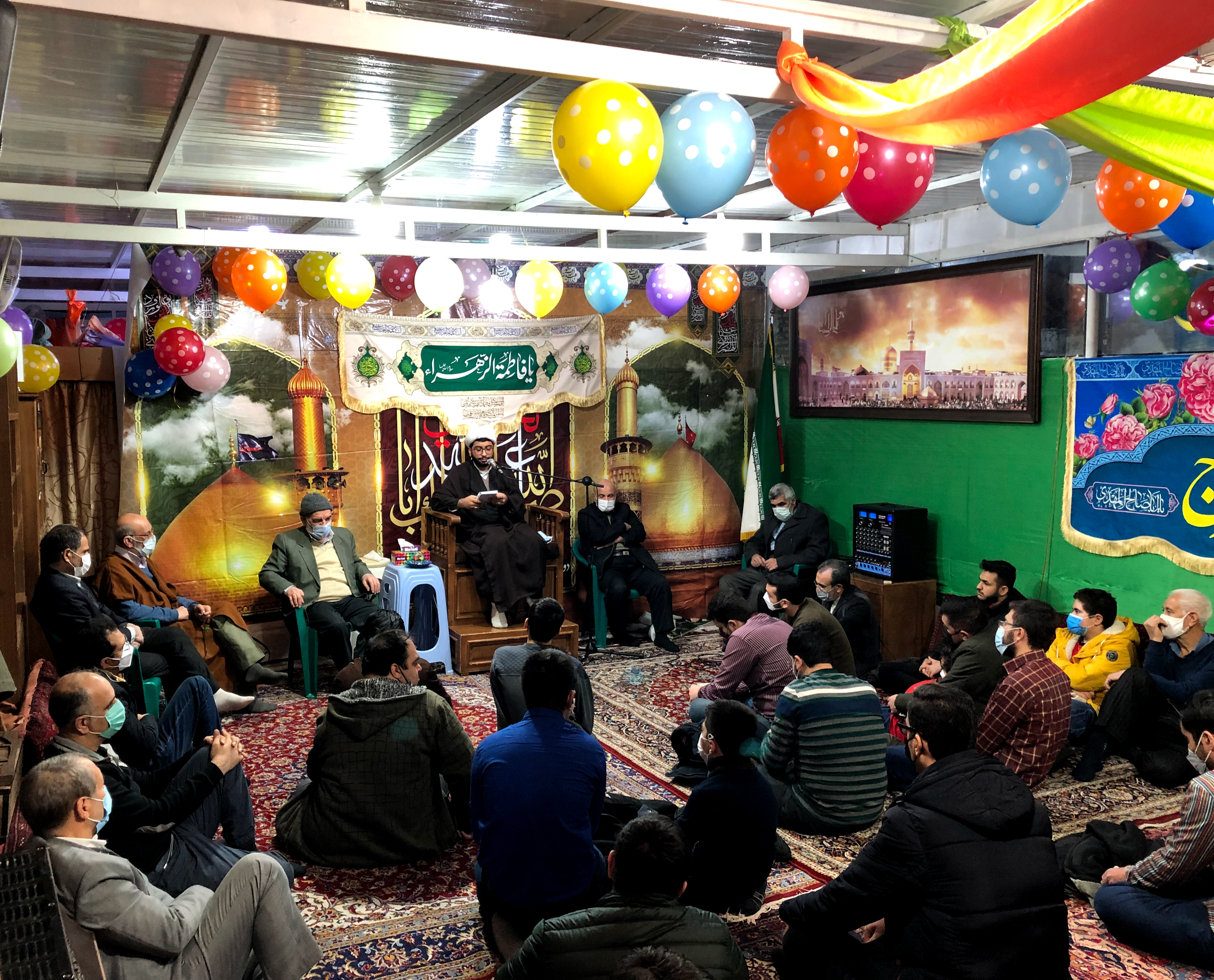
Celebration of Fatima's birthday and Mother's Day at Al-Zahra Mosque, Tehran

Mawlid is the anniversary of the birth of Muhammad and is celebrated on the 12th or 17th day of Rabi' al-awwal by adherents of Sunni and Shia Islam respectively. These are the two most commonly accepted dates of birth of Muhammad.

However, there is much controversy regarding the permissibility of celebrating Mawlid, as some Muslims judge the custom as an unacceptable practice according to Islamic tradition.

In Iran, Mother's Day is celebrated on the birthday of Fatima al-Zahra, the daughter of Muhammad. Banners reading Ya Fatima ("O Fatima") are displayed on government buildings, private buildings, public streets and car windows.

== Religious views ==
=== Judaism ===
In Judaism, rabbis are relatively divided about celebrating this custom, although the majority of the faithful accept it. In the Torah, the only mention of a birthday is the celebration of Pharaoh's birthday in Egypt (Genesis 40:20).

=== Christianity ===
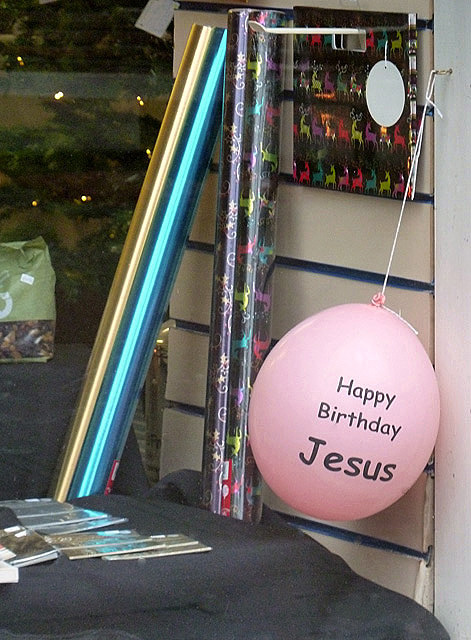
Christmas wrapping paper next to a birthday balloon for Jesus, displayed in the town of Galashiels, Scottish Borders, in December 2013

Although the birthday of Jesus of Nazareth is celebrated as a Christian holiday on December 25, historically the celebrating of an individual person's birthday has been subject to theological debate. Early Christians, notes The World Book Encyclopedia, "considered the celebration of anyone's birth to be a pagan custom." Origen, in his commentary "On Levites," wrote that Christians should not only refrain from celebrating their birthdays but should look at them with disgust as a pagan custom. A saint's day was typically celebrated on the anniversary of their martyrdom or death, considered the occasion of or preparation for their entrance into Heaven or the New Jerusalem.

Ordinary folk in the Middle Ages celebrated their saint's day (the saint they were named after), but nobility celebrated the anniversary of their birth. The "Squire's Tale", one of Chaucer's Canterbury Tales, opens as King Cambuskan proclaims a feast to celebrate his birthday.

In the Modern era, the Catholic Church, the Eastern Orthodox Church and Protestantism, i.e. the three main branches of Christianity, as well as almost all Christian religious denominations, consider celebrating birthdays acceptable or at most a choice of the individual. An exception is Jehovah's Witnesses, who do not celebrate them for various reasons: in their interpretation this feast has pagan origins, was not celebrated by early Christians, is negatively expounded in the Holy Scriptures and has customs linked to superstition and magic.

==== Name days ====
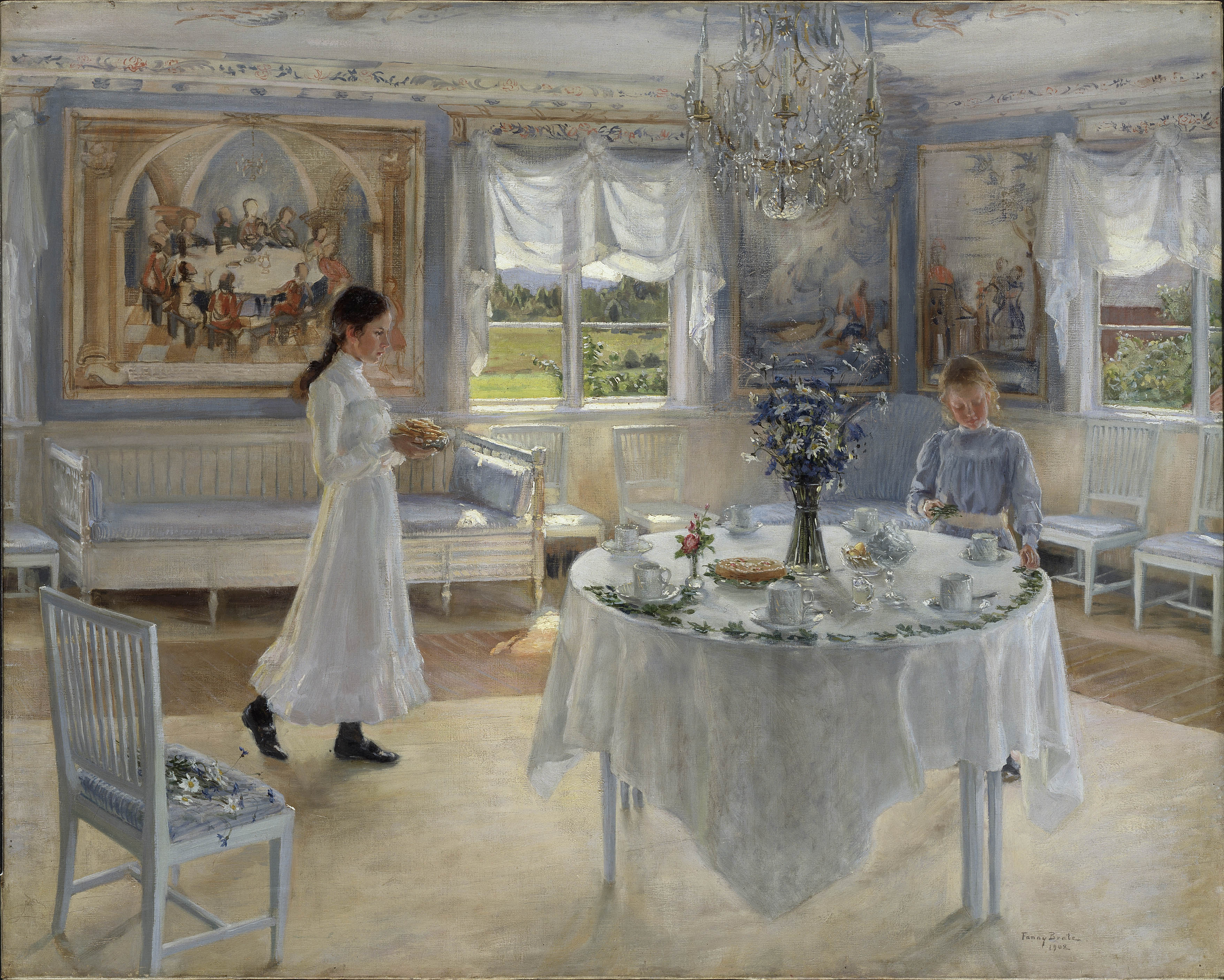
Namnsdag (1902), known in English as A Day of Celebration, by the Swedish artist Fanny Brate

In some historically Roman Catholic and Eastern Orthodox countries, (Note: Examples include Italy, Spain, France, parts of Germany, Poland, Russia, Romania, Bulgaria, Serbia, Slovakia, Czech Republic, Hungary, Greece, Lithuania, Latvia, and throughout Latin America.) it is common to have a 'name day', otherwise known as a 'Saint's day'. It is celebrated in much the same way as a birthday, but it is held on the official day of a saint with the same Christian name as the birthday person; the difference being that one may look up a person's name day in a calendar, or easily remember common name days (for example, John or Mary); however in pious traditions, the two were often made to concur by giving a newborn the name of a saint celebrated on its day of confirmation, more seldom one's birthday. Some are given the name of the religious feast of their christening's day or birthday, for example, Noel or Pascal (French for Christmas and "of Easter"); as another example, Togliatti was given Palmiro as his first name because he was born on Palm Sunday.

=== Islam ===
The birthday does not reflect Islamic tradition, and because of this, the majority of Muslims refrain from celebrating it. Others do not object, as long as it is not accompanied by behavior contrary to Islamic tradition. A good portion of Muslims (and Arab Christians) who have emigrated to the United States and Europe celebrate birthdays as customary, especially for children, while others abstain.

=== Hinduism ===
Hindus celebrate the birth anniversary day every year when the day that corresponds to the lunar month or solar month (Sun Signs Nirayana System – Sourava Mana Masa) of birth and has the same asterism (Star/Nakshatra) as that of the date of birth. That age is reckoned whenever Janma Nakshatra of the same month passes.

Hindus regard death to be more auspicious than birth, since the person is liberated from the bondages of material society. Also, traditionally, rituals and prayers for the departed are observed on the 5th and 11th days, with many relatives gathering.

== Historical and cultural perspectives ==
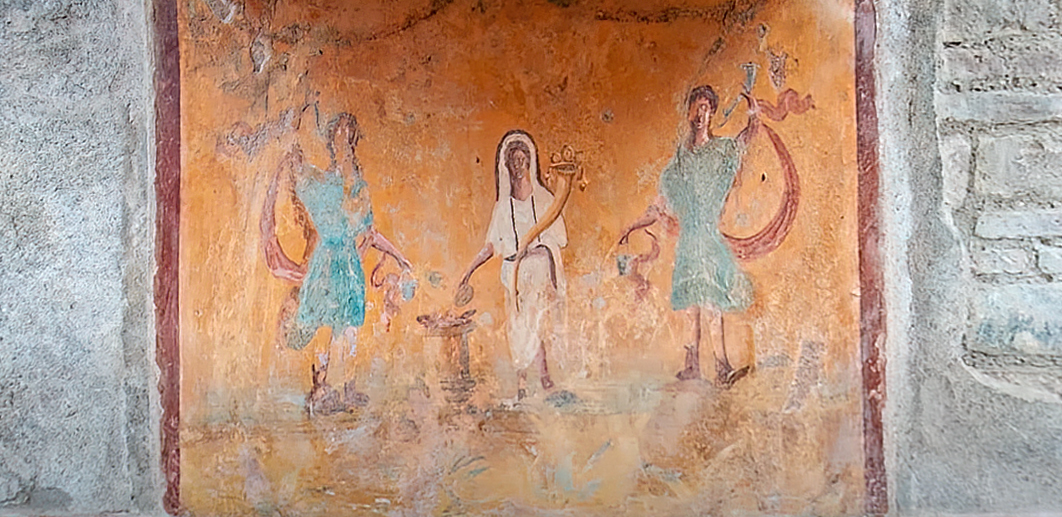
A Genius holding a cornucopia and pouring a libation on an altar, flanked by household Lares (fresco from Pompeii)

=== Classical antiquity ===
According to Herodotus (5th century BC), of all the days in the year, the one which the Persians celebrate most is their birthday. It was customary to have the board furnished on that day with an ampler supply than common: the richer people eat wholly baked cow, horse, camel, or donkey (Greek: ὄνον), while the poorer classes use instead the smaller kinds of cattle.

On his birthday, the king anointed his head and presented gifts to the Persians. According to the law of the Royal Supper, on that day "no one should be refused a request". The rule for drinking was "No restrictions".

==== Ancient Rome ====
In ancient Rome, a birthday (dies natalis) was originally an act of religious cultivation (cultus). A dies natalis was celebrated annually for a temple on the day of its founding, and the term is still used sometimes for the anniversary of an institution such as a university. The temple founding day might become the "birthday" of the deity housed there. March 1, for example, was celebrated as the birthday of the god Mars.

Each human likewise had a natal divinity, the guardian spirit called the Genius, or sometimes the Juno for a woman, who was owed religious devotion on the day of birth, usually in the household shrine (lararium). The decoration of a lararium often shows the Genius in the role of the person carrying out the rites. A person marked their birthday with ritual acts that might include lighting an altar, saying prayers, making vows (vota), anointing and wreathing a statue of the Genius, or sacrificing to a patron deity. Incense, cakes, and wine were common offerings.

Celebrating someone else's birthday was a way to show affection, friendship, or respect. In exile, the poet Ovid, though alone, celebrated not only his own birthday rite but that of his far distant wife. Birthday parties affirmed social as well as sacred ties. One of the Vindolanda tablets is an invitation to a birthday party from the wife of one Roman officer to the wife of another. Books were a popular birthday gift, sometimes handcrafted as a luxury edition or composed especially for the person honored. Birthday poems are a minor but distinctive genre of Latin literature. The banquets, libations, and offerings or gifts that were a regular part of most Roman religious observances thus became part of birthday celebrations for individuals.

A highly esteemed person would continue to be celebrated on their birthday after death, in addition to the several holidays on the Roman calendar for commemorating the dead collectively. Birthday commemoration was considered so important that money was often bequeathed to a social organization to fund an annual banquet in the deceased's honor. The observance of a patron's birthday or the honoring of a political figure's Genius was one of the religious foundations for imperial cult or so-called "emperor worship."

=== Asia ===
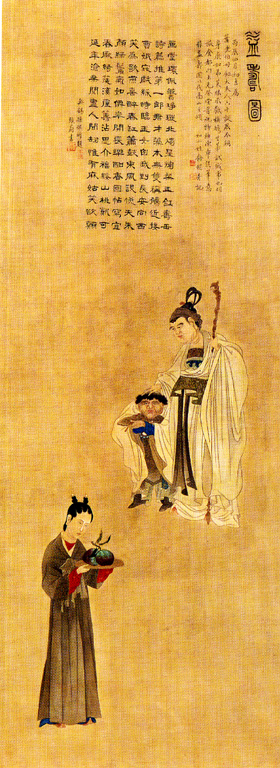
A Birthday Celebration (dated bing chen, 1916, fourth month), hanging scroll with dedication

==== China ====
The Chinese word for "year(s) old" (t 歲, s 岁, suì) is entirely different from the usual word for "year(s)" (年, nián), reflecting the former importance of Chinese astrology and the belief that one's fate was bound to the stars imagined to be in opposition to the planet Jupiter at the time of one's birth. The importance of this duodecennial orbital cycle only survives in popular culture as the 12 animals of the Chinese zodiac, which change each Chinese New Year and may be used as a theme for some gifts or decorations. Because of the importance attached to the influence of these stars in ancient China and throughout the Sinosphere, East Asian age reckoning previously began with one at birth and then added years at each Chinese New Year, so that it formed a record of the suì one had lived through rather than of the exact amount of time from one's birth. This method—which can differ by as much as two years of age from other systems—is increasingly uncommon and is not used for official purposes in the PRC or on Taiwan, although the word suì is still used for describing age.

Traditionally, Chinese birthdays—when celebrated—were reckoned using the lunisolar calendar, which varies from the Gregorian calendar by as much as a month forward or backward depending on the year. Celebrating the lunisolar birthday remains common on Taiwan while growing increasingly uncommon on the mainland.

Birthday traditions reflected the culture's deep-seated focus on longevity and wordplay. From the homophony in some dialects between 酒 ("rice wine") and 久 (meaning "long" in the sense of time passing), osmanthus and other rice wines are traditional gifts for birthdays in China. Longevity noodles are another traditional food consumed on the day, although western-style birthday cakes are increasingly common among urban Chinese. Hongbao—red envelopes stuffed with money, now especially the red 100 RMB notes—are the usual gift from relatives and close family friends for most children. Gifts for adults on their birthdays are much less common, although the birthday for each decade is a larger occasion that might prompt a large dinner and celebration.

==== Japan ====
The Japanese reckoned their birthdays by the Chinese system until the Meiji Reforms. Celebrations remained uncommon or muted until after the American occupation that followed World War II. Children's birthday parties are the most important, typically celebrated with a cake, candles, and singing. Adults often just celebrate with their partner.

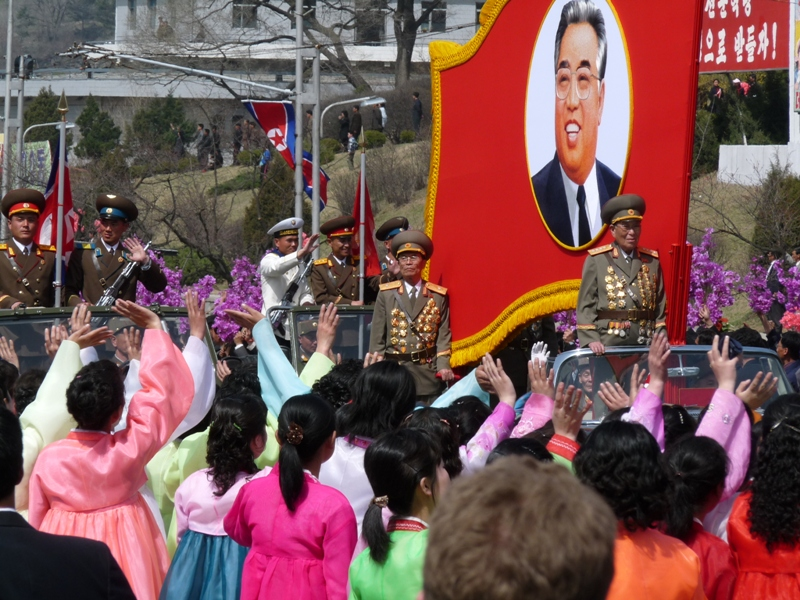
A military parade on the Day of the Sun 2012

==== North Korea ====
In North Korea, the Day of the Sun, Kim Il Sung's birthday, is the most important public holiday of the country, and Kim Jong Il's birthday is celebrated as the Day of the Shining Star. North Koreans are not permitted to celebrate birthdays on July 8 and December 17 because these were the dates of the deaths of Kim Il Sung and Kim Jong Il, respectively. More than 100,000 North Koreans celebrate displaced birthdays on July 9 and December 18 instead to avoid these dates. A person born on July 8 before 1994 may change their birthday, with official recognition.

==== South Korea ====
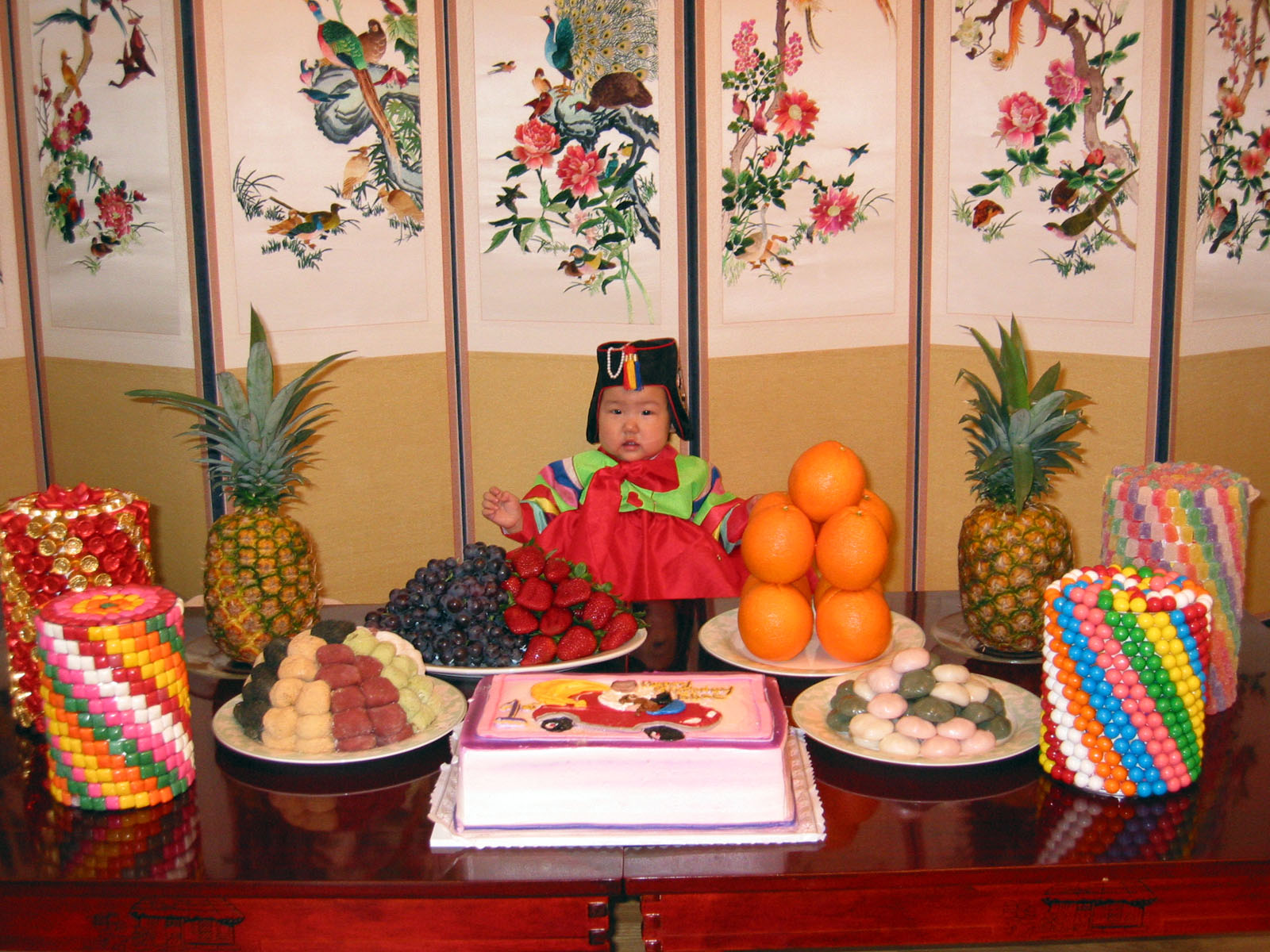
A Korean child's birthday party at home

South Korea was one of the last countries to use a form of East Asian age reckoning for many official purposes. Prior to June 2023, three systems were used together—"Korean ages" that start with 1 at birth and increase every January 1 with the Gregorian New Year, "year ages" that start with 0 at birth and otherwise increase the same way, and "actual ages" that start with 0 at birth and increase each birthday. In June 2023, all Korean ages were set back at least one year, and official ages are now reckoned only by birthdays. First birthdays in Korea are heavily celebrated, despite having traditionally had little to do with the child's age.

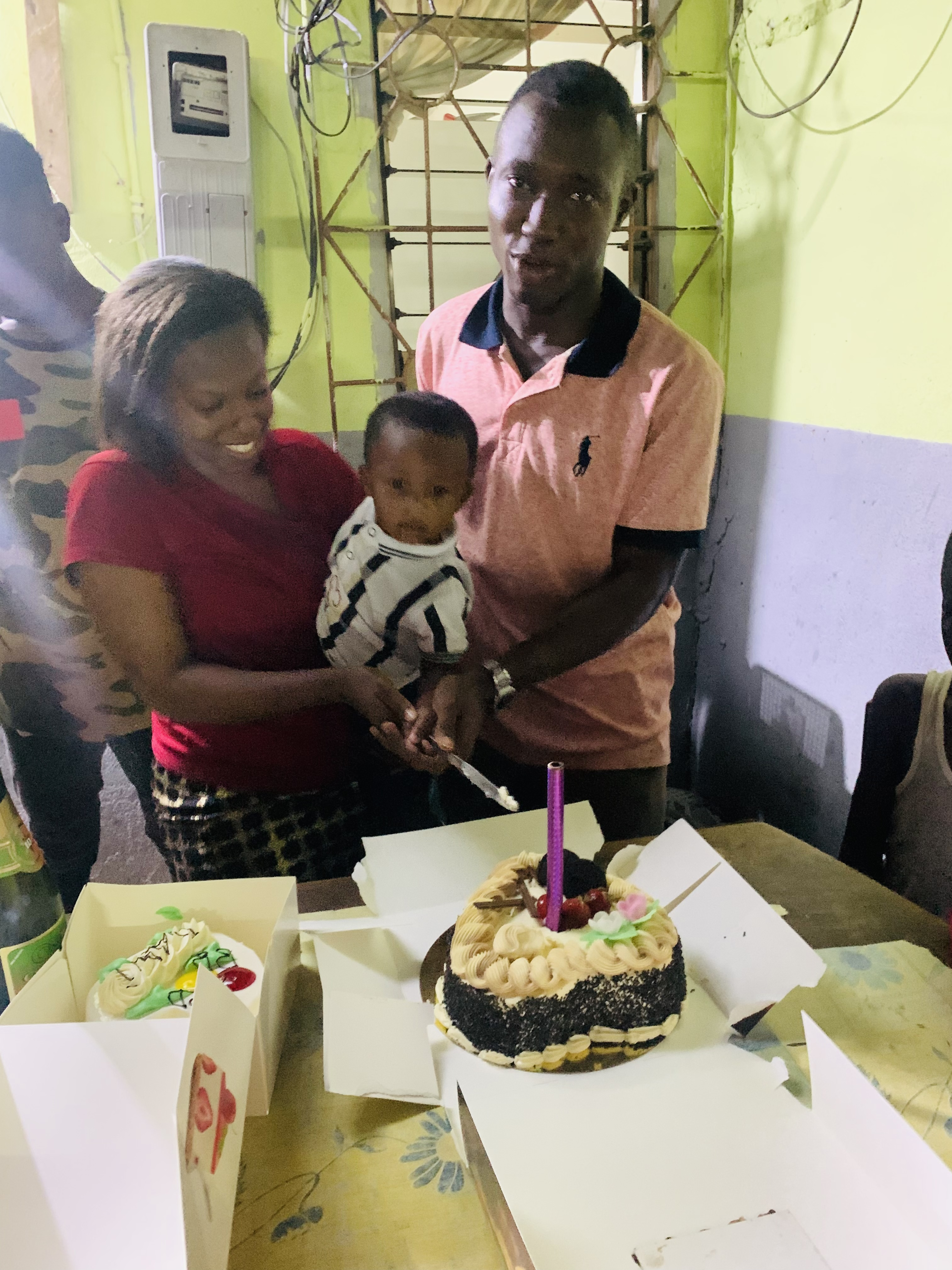
A child's first birthday cake in Abidjan, Ivory Coast

=== Africa ===
==== Ghana ====
In Ghana, children wake up on their birthday to a special treat called oto, which is a patty made from mashed sweet potato and eggs fried in palm oil. Later they have a birthday party where they usually eat stew and rice and a dish known as kelewele, which is fried plantain chunks.

== Distribution through the year ==
Peak birth month

Interactive heat map of the birth ratio of each day of the year to the annual average in the US (top) and in England and Wales (bottom). Numbers over 1 (shown in red) indicate more births than average were recorded for that day.

Birthdays are fairly evenly distributed throughout the year, with some seasonal effects.

In the United States, there tend to be more births in September and October. This may be because there is a holiday season nine months before (the human gestation period is about nine months), or because the longest nights of the year also occur in the Northern Hemisphere nine months before. However, the holidays affect birth rates more than the winter: New Zealand, a Southern Hemisphere country, has the same September and October peak with no corresponding peak in March and April. The least common birthdays tend to fall around public holidays, such as Christmas, New Year's Day and fixed-date holidays such as Independence Day in the US, which falls on July 4.

Between 1973 and 1999, September 16 was the most common birthday in the United States, and December 25 was the least common birthday (other than February 29 because of leap years). In 2011, October 5 and 6 were reported as the most frequently occurring birthdays.

New Zealand's most common birthday is September 29, and the least common birthday is December 25. The ten most common birthdays all fall within a thirteen-day period, between September 22 and October 4. The ten least common birthdays (other than February 29) are December 24–27, January 1–2, February 6, March 22, April 1, and April 25. This is based on all live births registered in New Zealand between 1980 and 2017.

Positive and negative associations with culturally significant dates may influence birth rates. The study shows a 5.3% decrease in spontaneous births and a 16.9% decrease in Caesarean births on Halloween, compared to dates occurring within one week before and one week after the October holiday. In contrast, on Valentine's Day, there is a 3.6% increase in spontaneous births and a 12.1% increase in Caesarean births.

In Sweden, 9.3% of the population is born in March and 7.3% in November, when a uniform distribution would give 8.3%.

=== Leap day ===
In the Gregorian calendar (a common solar calendar), February in a leap year has 29 days instead of the usual 28, so the year lasts 366 days instead of the usual 365.

A person born on February 29 may be called a "leapling" or a "leaper". In common years, they usually celebrate their birthdays on February 28. In some situations, March 1 is used as the birthday in a non-leap year since it is the day following February 28.

Technically, a leapling will have fewer birthday anniversaries than their age in years. This phenomenon is exploited when a person claims to be only a quarter of their actual age, by counting their leap-year birthday anniversaries only. In Gilbert and Sullivan's 1879 comic opera The Pirates of Penzance, Frederic the pirate apprentice discovers that he is bound to serve the pirates until his 21st birthday rather than until his 21st year. For legal purposes, legal birthdays depend on how local laws count time intervals.

=== Beddian birthday ===
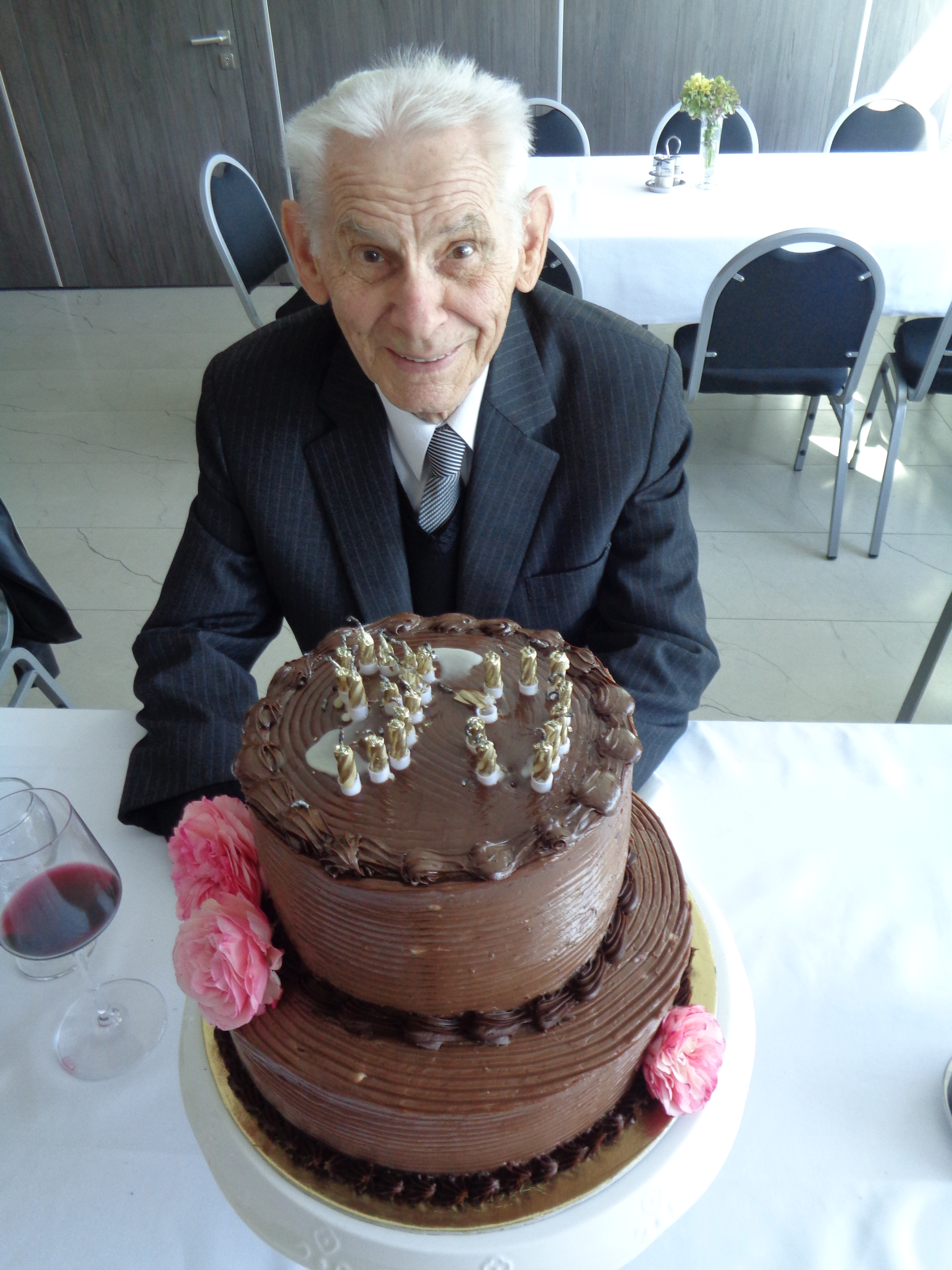
A 90th birthday celebration

An individual's Beddian birthday, named in tribute to firefighter Bobby Beddia, occurs during the year that their age matches the last two digits of the year they were born.

=== Statistical risk of dying ===
Some studies show people are more likely to die on their birthdays, with explanations including excessive drinking, suicide, cardiovascular events due to high stress or happiness, efforts to postpone death for major social events, and death certificate paperwork errors.

== See also ==
- Various birthdays are mentioned on the pages devoted to each day of the year, from January 1 to December 31; see List of days of the year
- List of birthday songs
- Birthday problem
- Birthday attack
- Half-birthday
- Death anniversary/Yahrzeit
- Unbirthday
- Shashthipurti
- Birthstones
- Birthday color
