= Halo Burger =

Fast food chain based in Flint, Michigan, United States

Halo Burger Holdings, LLC
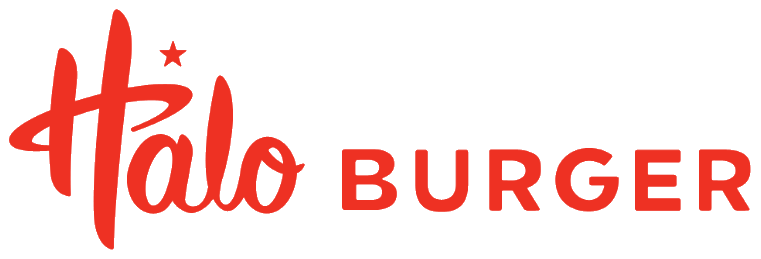

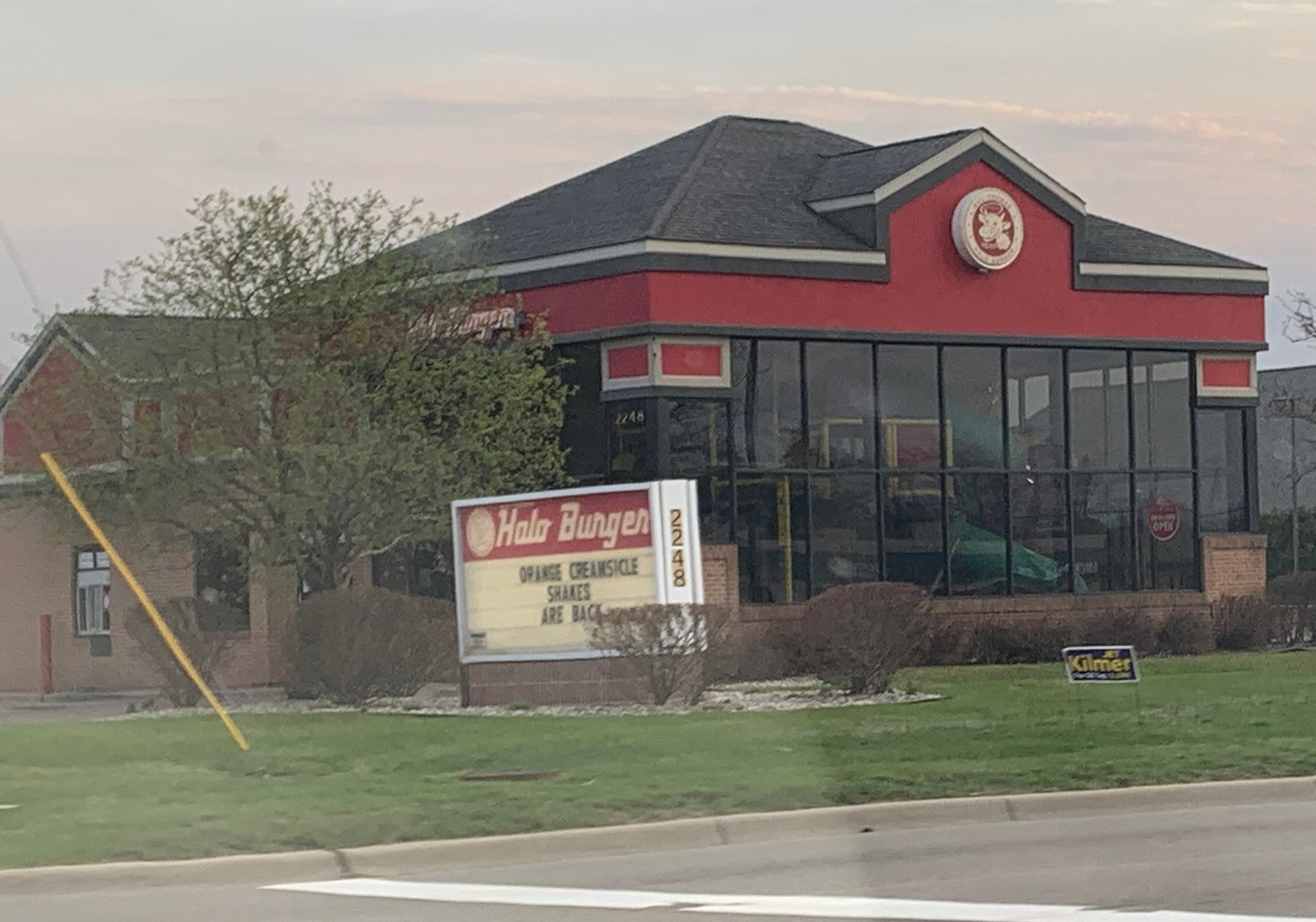
- A Halo Burger in Grand Blanc, Michigan
- Trade name: Halo Burger
- Type: Private LLC
- Industry: Fast food
- Founded: Flint, Michigan, U.S. (1923)
- Founder: Samuel V. Blair
- Headquarters: Burton, Michigan, United States
- Number of locations: 8 restaurants; 1 food truck; 9 total (September 2017)
- Area served: MI: Central Michigan
- Key people: Achille DiNello; (CEO, Halo Burger Holdings, LLC); Robert Kulza; (Halo Burger Holdings COO); Domenique Lopez; (Director of Marketing)
- Products: Hamburgers; Chicken; Fish; French Fries; Milkshakes
- Members: Chance Richie; Daniel Stern
- Number of employees: 350 (2013)
- Website: haloburger.com

Halo Burger, formerly known by its full name Bill Thomas' Halo Burger, is an American fast-food restaurant chain based in Genesee County, Michigan. The restaurant began in 1923 as the first location of hamburger chain Kewpee, in downtown Flint, Michigan. After separating from the Kewpee chain in 1967 with two locations, the chain has maintained a number of locations in and around the Flint area.

== History ==
Samuel V. Blair opened the Kewpee restaurant in downtown Flint and expanded to approximately 400 locations by 1939 through licensing the name. Blair sold the rights to the Kewpee trademarks to Toledo, Ohio Kewpee operator Edwin Adams in 1926. William "Bill" V. Thomas started working at Blair's Kewpee in 1938. Thomas began leasing the original Harrison Street, Flint location from Blair upon his retirement on April 1, 1944. Blair died in 1945 and Thomas continued to lease the location and pay royalties to Adams for use of the Kewpee name. The Blair estate's Kewpee location went up for sale in 1958. Thomas was able to purchase the Flint location. Thomas expanded with a second Kewpee location downtown Flint with the purchase of Vernor's Ginger Ale building in 1951.

=== Halo Burger ===
Adams switched from a trademark license of Kewpee to a full franchising arrangement in 1967. Thomas rejected this new arrangement and changed the name of his restaurants to Bill Thomas' Halo Burger. Halo Burgers' first location only under the Halo Burger name opened in 1973 on Linden Road, the same year that Thomas died. In 1976, two more locations opened: one located on Pierson Road, and another in Grand Blanc. In 1979, the Harrison location was vacated to make way for University of Michigan-Flint parking. The staff of the former Harrison Street location were transferred to a newly opened Halo Burger serving Flint's east side.

The 1980s became a decade of expansion with 10 more locations, starting in 1984 with another downtown Flint location. In 1985, Halo Burger expanded to Birch Run, with a location that was opened on property leased at Conlee Oil Company's station. Locations in Saginaw and Flint's Southwest side opened in 1986. Another location in Saginaw followed in 1987 along with the Richfield Road and Genesee Valley Center locations. Three more locations opened in 1988: in Fenton, at Atherton Road and at Corunna Road near Ballenger Highway. The Saginaw, Genesee Valley Center and Corunna Road locations later closed. Their Grand Blanc Downtown location closed in 1998 and was replaced by a location in Grand Blanc Township.

On September 5, 2002, Halo Burger takes over the former Campus Cafe at University of Michigan-Flint University Center. In November, the company recalled flashlights that were given out with kid's meals. On July 22, 2007, all 11 locations were shut down for a day due to a possible E. coli contamination as their supplier, Abbott's Meat, had recalled a number of meat products and received meat from a temporary supplier. Due to the new student housing and 24-hour food service, Sodexo, that goes along the housing, the University Center location closed April 21, 2008.

=== Dortch Enterprises ownership ===
An initial attempt to sell the chain to key employees fell through after issues with the bank. As his son was uninterested in 2010, the Thomas family sold the nine location chain to Dortch Enterprises, which operates multiple Subway restaurants in Michigan, with the sale completed on December 29, 2010 for a price of about $10 million. Dortch will be expanding to new locations and making over of the restaurants towards a "fast-casual feel" with earth tones and "upscale decor". In 2011, the company announced they are adding locations in the Oakland County/Detroit metro area in late 2012 and that they would be adding 2 to 3 locations per year. While Dortch feels that Halo Burger locations would do well in East Lansing with Michigan State University and Ann Arbor with University of Michigan having Flint area university students, plans for opening in those cities have been put on hold.

In June 2011, the Company broke ground for a new 10th location in Grand Blanc Township on Holly Road. Three other sites have been selected for new locations: Fenton, Lapeer and Lapeer Road, Davison. In October the Holly Road location opened.

One opened in a gas station in Mount Morris in February 2012. In August 2012, Dortch filed and received approval for a site plan for a joint Halo Burger-Subway location on Belsay Road in Burton.

In January 2013, Halo Burger's Fenton location moved to a former Burger King building on Leroy Street. A new Brighton, Michigan location was scheduled to open in May in Livingston County and would have been their first location in the Metro Detroit area. In March, Dortch announced plans for 5 Oakland County locations: Troy, Clarkston, Novi, Bingham Farms and Farmington Hills and an East Lansing location to open this year along with the existing announced Brighton location. The joint Halo Burger-Subway Burton location opened March 27.

On February 5, 2013, Dortch Halo Enterprises sued a Grand Blanc man who is using @haloburger Twitter handle since 2009 and has been unwilling to turn the handle over to the company without payment. The man's defense is that he is not using it commercial, Twitter handles are first come first served and the "Halo Burger" trademark was supposedly rejected by the U.S. Trademark Office for being too similar to another trademark. Dortch Halo dropped the lawsuit to "prevent more controversy." in April.

On May 8, 2013, the Halo Burger in Clarkston opens, its first in Oakland County with a shift to fast casual format with no drive-through in its Oakland County locations. On October 6, Ferndale and Rochester locations were revealed to be under construction along with four others already announced with the Frandor Shopping Center, Lansing location opening up on the 7th.

In early March 2014, the third fully fast-casual format location was opened in Troy. The week of July 26, Dortch Halo opened it seventeenth location at the Brighton Mall, Brighton. By 2016, two locations were closed, Troy and Clarkston.

=== Halo Country subsidiary ===
Dortch Enterprises sold the 15-location Halo Burger chain to Halo Country LLC on January 14, 2016. Halo Country is majority owned by Chance Richie, who has been involved in investment banking and the oil and gas industry. With the Flint water crisis occurring, the three Flint and Burton locations were handing out free bottled water on January 22, 2016, with support from Coca Cola Company.

In March 2016, Halo Burger began renovating its downtown Flint location with plans to continue renovation at locations in Birch Run and on Linden Road in Flint Township. Office were being added upstairs at the downtown location. Also in early March, a new location was opened at the Palace of Auburn Hills in the chain's first professional sports partnership. Starting with the July 2016 Back to the Bricks, the company would have a Halo Burger food truck for community events.

Three locations, Brighton, Novi and Fenton Road, were closed in late September 2016 due to poor sales. Halo Country felt a drive-thru would improve sales at Metro Detroit locations, but the cost and location outside of Halo Burgers' area of recognition made that unreasonable. By September 29, 2016, the Brighton location was closed with a Burgerland opened in its location.

Two stores in Genesee County closed on January 6, 2017. The Mt. Morris Township location was in a Beacon & Bridge gas station where Halo could not agree on a new lease with the landlord. A replace site is being look for with expectation of reopening in late 2017. While, the Richfield Road, Genesee Township location was closed due to lack of sales and closeness to three others. In September 2017, its Holly Road, Grand Blanc Township location was closed then the location was leased by Halo Country to Tiki Pineapple restaurant in August 2018.

In January 2017, Halo Burger signed Andre Drummond as its first spokesperson and brand ambassador, which arose out of his interest in Flint arising out of the water crisis and Piston owner's Flint Now response effort. In February 2017, Drummond will design his own burger, the Dre Burger, to join the menu in the second quarter and participate in community outreach of the company. The Dre Burger debut on April 16, 2017, with a benefit official launch event on Saturday, May 6, 2017.

Thrillist named Halo Burger one of the 10 most underrated burger chains in February 2017 calling out The Beefy Double cheeseburger as the chain's best burger and its signatures burger as the Olive Burger and the "drink of choice", the Boston Cooler. Originating under the Thomas ownership, the chain revived a coffee pricing promotion starting on January 3, 2018. A regular-sized (14 ounces) coffee is price at the high temperature of the day but not less than 10 cents and during the work week.

By March 18, 2018, the Saginaw Street Downtown Flint location started serving breakfast again, which was stopped about a decade back. The chain has plans to roll out breakfast to other locations throughout the year.

Construction on Saginaw Street led to the temporary closure of their Downtown Flint location.

=== Halo Burger Holdings LLC ===
In December 2024, Detroit area restaurant owner Achille DiNello acquired Halo Burger which, after renovations, reopened the Saginaw Street location in April 2026. That location in the future may add offerings from Cops & Doughnuts which started a joint venture with Halo Burger in 2025. The new management named the company Halo Burger Holdings LLC.

== Menu ==
- Q.P.: Original called the Kewpee, its name is a phonetic sound-out of the original name. The Q.P. is also a short form reference to the patty size, a quarter pound hamburger. This still today remains one of the Halo Burger's most popular sandwiches, especially with olives.
  - Olive Burger - a Q.P. with olives
- The Beefy Double
- Boston Cooler - with Vernor's Ginger Ale
- Specialty burgers
  - BLT Cheddar Burger
  - Hula Burger
  - Thai Burger
  - Marsala Brie
  - HaloPeño Burger
  - Dre Burger - two patties, bacon strips, cheese, pineapple, crispy and raw onion ring and a mix of Halo & BBQ sauces
- hot dogs - supplied by Koegel
- Coney dog - Flint style
- Salads
- Turkey burger - Jennie-O

== Notable location ==
The Downtown Flint location was previously Vernor's Retail Store and Sandwich shop built in 1929. A Vernor's Ginger Ale mural (including the ginger ale's gnome mascot) covers the adjacent Greater Flint Arts Council building and was painted by John Gonsowski. The restaurant's interior iron railing still contain large wrought V's.

== Awards ==
- 1978 Top 100 United States Burgers by a national radio survey
- 1983 Voted Flint's #1 hamburger by a Flint Journal Newspaper survey
- 2000 Voted Michigan's #1 hamburger by a Detroit News Reader Survey
- 2011 Best Hamburger of Genesee Readers' Choice Awards, The Flint Journal

== See also ==
- List of hamburger restaurants
