= History of Greek Americans in Metro Detroit =

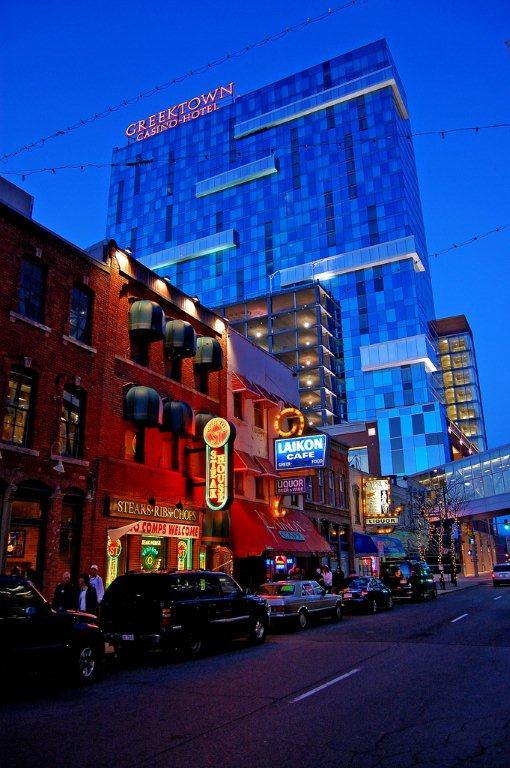
Greektown

As of 1999 120,000 people in Metro Detroit indicated they are of Greek descent. Stavros K. Frangos, author of Greeks in Michigan, stated "From the 1890s to the present all available sources agree that" about one third of Michigan's Greek Americans live in Metro Detroit.

At the turn of the 20th Century the first Greek immigrants arrived. The first year of entry was 1886. Theodore Gerasimos was the first documented Greek immigrant. Detroit's Greeks began working in automobile factories and railroads, and some others became merchants; many merchants lived above or near their stores. Very few Greeks became farmers in the United States, even though many had backgrounds in agriculture. The first Greek settlement in Detroit was between St. Antoine and Beaubien on Monroe Street. The Greeks later moved to Macomb Street. In the beginning of the year 1900, the city's first Greek coffeeshop opened on 40 Macomb Street.

There were 250 Greeks in Detroit in 1909. In 1912 persecution of Greeks began, prompting immigration from Greece. The period 1911 to 1917 was the peak immigration period from Greece. In 1914 there were up to 8,000 Greeks in the city. In 1914 a wave of immigration from Greece came because Henry Ford offered his $5 per day jobs. The Greek population rose to 10,000 to 15,000 by 1930.

The Peloponnese was the source of most Greek immigration to Detroit. Frangos wrote that "While no other reliable statistics are available, certainly Greeks from the three islands of Chios, Crete, and Cyprus have always made up a sizeable element of the community." The National Centre of Social Research in Athens, by 1972, estimated that the State of Michigan had ethnic 100,000 Greeks. In 1999 The Detroit News stated that the Greeks were "well-assimilated." By 2012 Detroit's Greeks moved to suburban communities. Suburbs with Greek Americans include Lincoln Park and St. Clair Shores.

== Economy ==
Historically many Greek immigrants operated Coney islands, or restaurants serving Detroit Coney dogs. In the 1960s and early 1970s Greek immigrants established the Coney chains Kerby's Coney Island, Leo's Coney Island, and National Coney Island. All three chains sell some Greek food items with Coney dogs. A previous Greek-established restaurant, Onassis Coney Island, closed.

== Geography ==
The Greek ethnic enclave of Greektown is still active. Because of the Greek immigration, within Michigan the most academic studies on Greek people are conducted in Detroit.

== Media ==
As of 1951 the Greek newspapers published in Metro Detroit included Detroit Athens (Athenai), Greek Tribune, and Michigan AHEPAN. In addition the Californian, a newspaper published in California, and the Chicago-based Greek Star, Greek Press of Chicago, and the National Herald and Atlantis were other Greek newspapers distributed in Metro Detroit.

== Education ==
A.H.E.P.A. rented middle school classrooms and church rooms to conduct Greek language classes.

== Notable residents ==
- Louis Perentis - He was a merchant who was one of the first Greeks to arrive in Detroit. Richard Bak, author of Detroit: 1900-1930, wrote that he was "reputed to have been Detroit's first Greek millionaire."
- Spyros Politis - He was the founder of the Detroit Pontian Society."
