= National Coney Island =

American restaurant chain

- Industry: Restaurants
- Genre: Coney Island
- Founded: 1965; 61 years ago; Roseville, Michigan, U.S.
- Founder: James Giftos
- Headquarters: Roseville, Michigan, U.S.
- Area served: Metropolitan Detroit
- Website: nationalconeyisland.com

National Coney Island is a chain of restaurants specializing in American classic foods, particularly known for its Coney Island-style hot dogs. Founded in Roseville, Michigan, the chain has 20 locations across metropolitan Detroit.

== History ==
Founded by Greek immigrant James Giftos in 1965, the first National Coney Island opened in Macomb Mall in Roseville, Michigan. The menu was simple and included Coney Island hot dogs, loose hamburgers, and chili, all advertised on hand-painted wooden menu boards, for 35 cents per coney dog.

It expanded in the late 1960s, with new outlets in St. Clair Shores (1969) and Detroit (1971). The 1980s and 1990s saw significant growth, with the restaurant chain reaching 11 locations. With increasing success, Giftos began to diversify the menu to appeal to families, updated the decor, and introduced unique elements like drive-thrus and the sale of beer and wine at some locations.

== Locations ==
National Coney Island locations are all located in Metropolitan Detroit. Under the direction of Tom Giftos, Jr., Giftos’s son, the chain is shifting toward "express"-style National Coney Islands, targeting expansions in airports, stadiums, and colleges. The corporate business plans on expanding the company at least two units per year, and these locations range in size from 6,000 to 9,000 square feet. Several stores also contain a drive-thru. The corporate headquarters is located in Roseville, which is where the first National Coney Island was established.

The Gratiot Avenue location in Roseville features an interior wall mural that is a homage to Diego Rivera's Detroit Industry Murals at the Detroit Institute of Arts, depicting coney dogs on an assembly line instead of automobiles.

== See also ==
- Coney Island hot dog
- History of the Greek Americans in Metro Detroit
