= Dortch =

Dortch is a surname. Notable people with the surname include:

- Charles Dortch (born 1940) US born archaeologist active in Western Australia
- Greg Dortch (born 1998), American football player
- Isaac Foote Dortch, captain of the United States Navy
- Richard Dortch, Assemblies of God District Superintendent for Illinois and an Assemblies of God Executive Presbyter
- William Theophilus Dortch, American politician from North Carolina

== See also ==
- The USS Dortch, destroyer of the United States Navy named for Isaac Foote Dortch
- Dortch Enterprises, American fast food franchisee
