= Vasil Eshcoff =

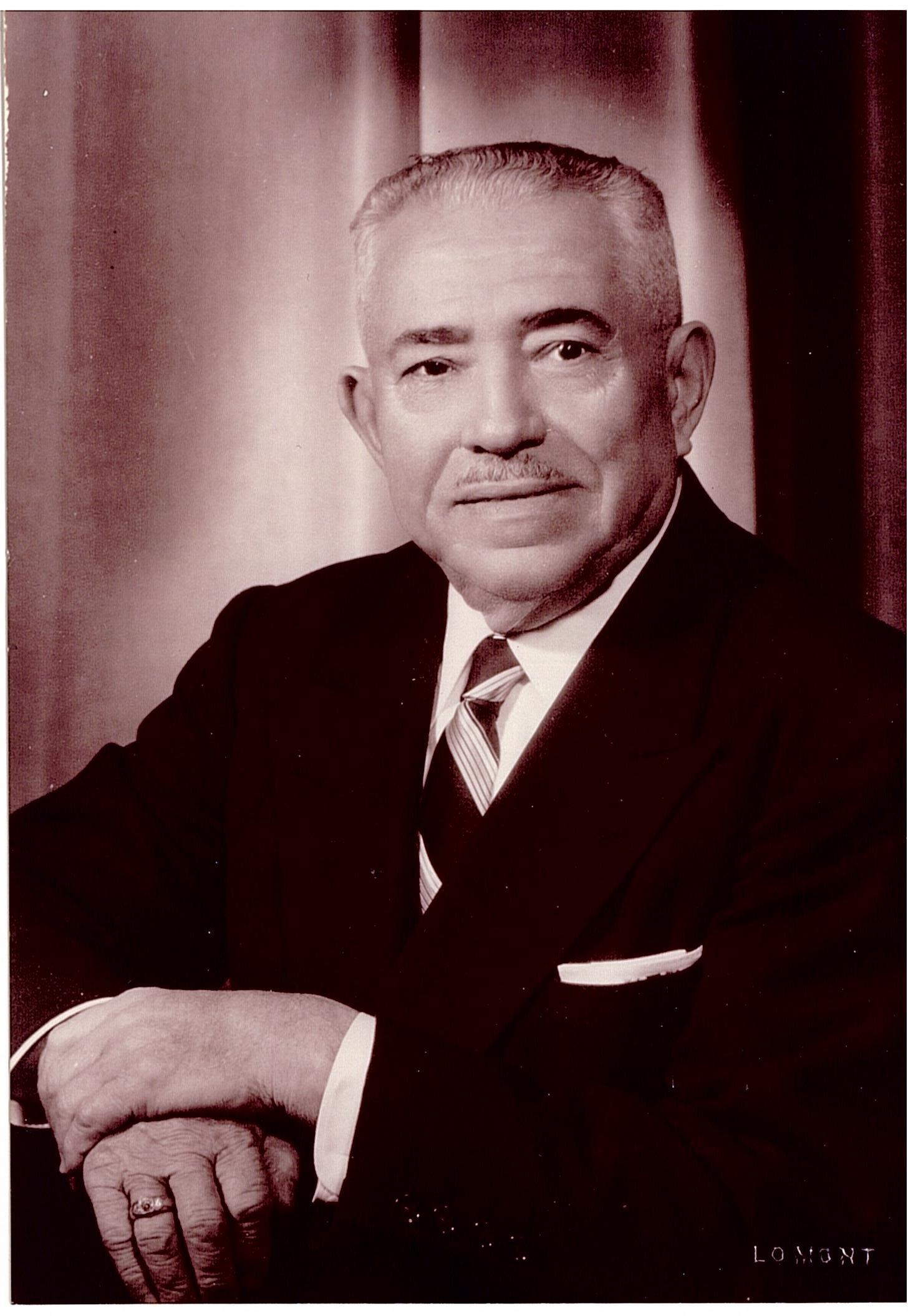
- Vasil K. Eshcoff
- Born: 25 November 1882; Visheni, Kastoria, Ottoman Empire (present-day Greece)
- Died: 15 June 1961 (aged 78); Fort Wayne, Indiana, USA
- Occupations: Businessman, President of Macedonian Patriotic Organization

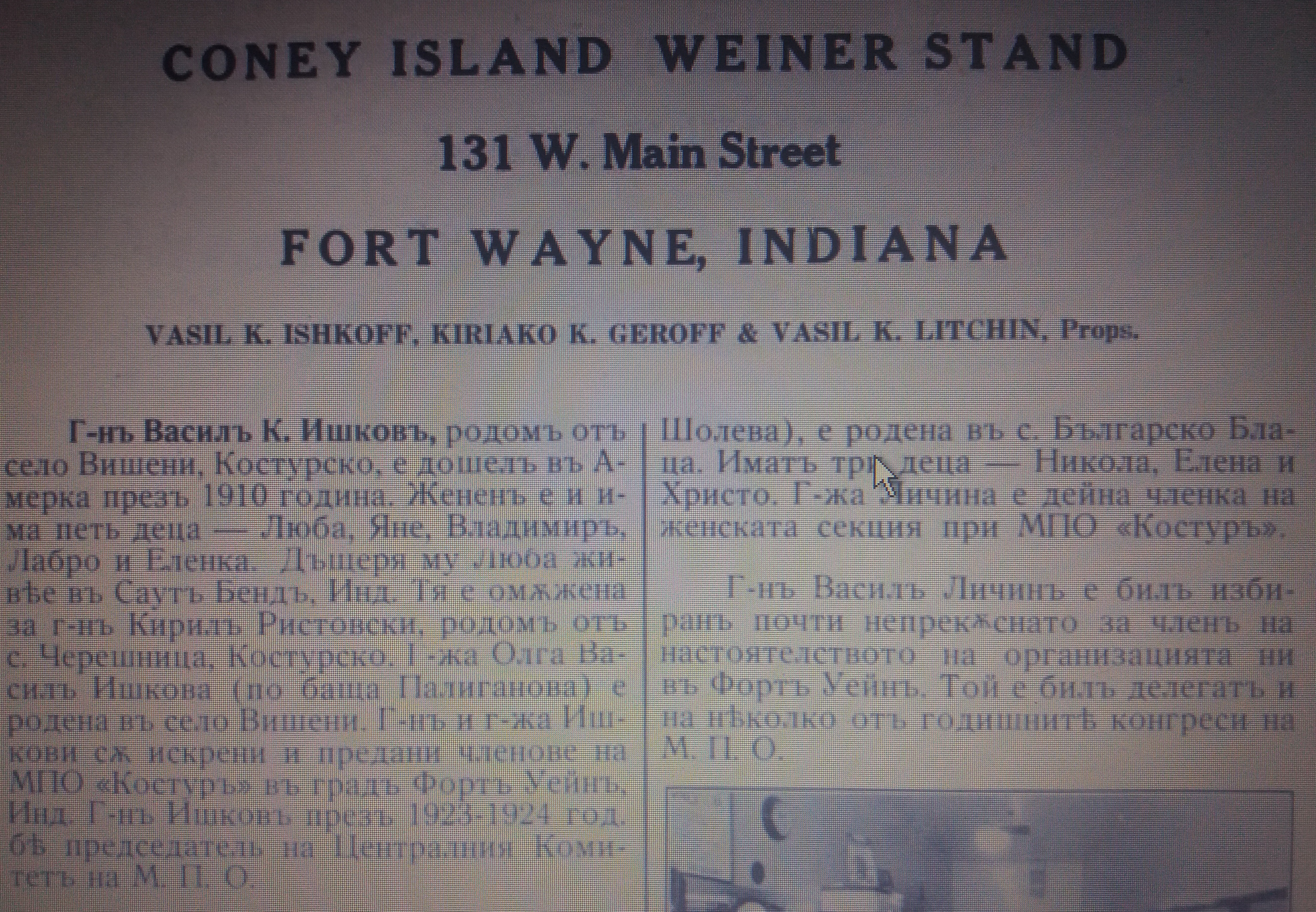
Advertisement of Coney Island Weiner Stand. There is a short biography of Eshcoff in Bulgarian language.

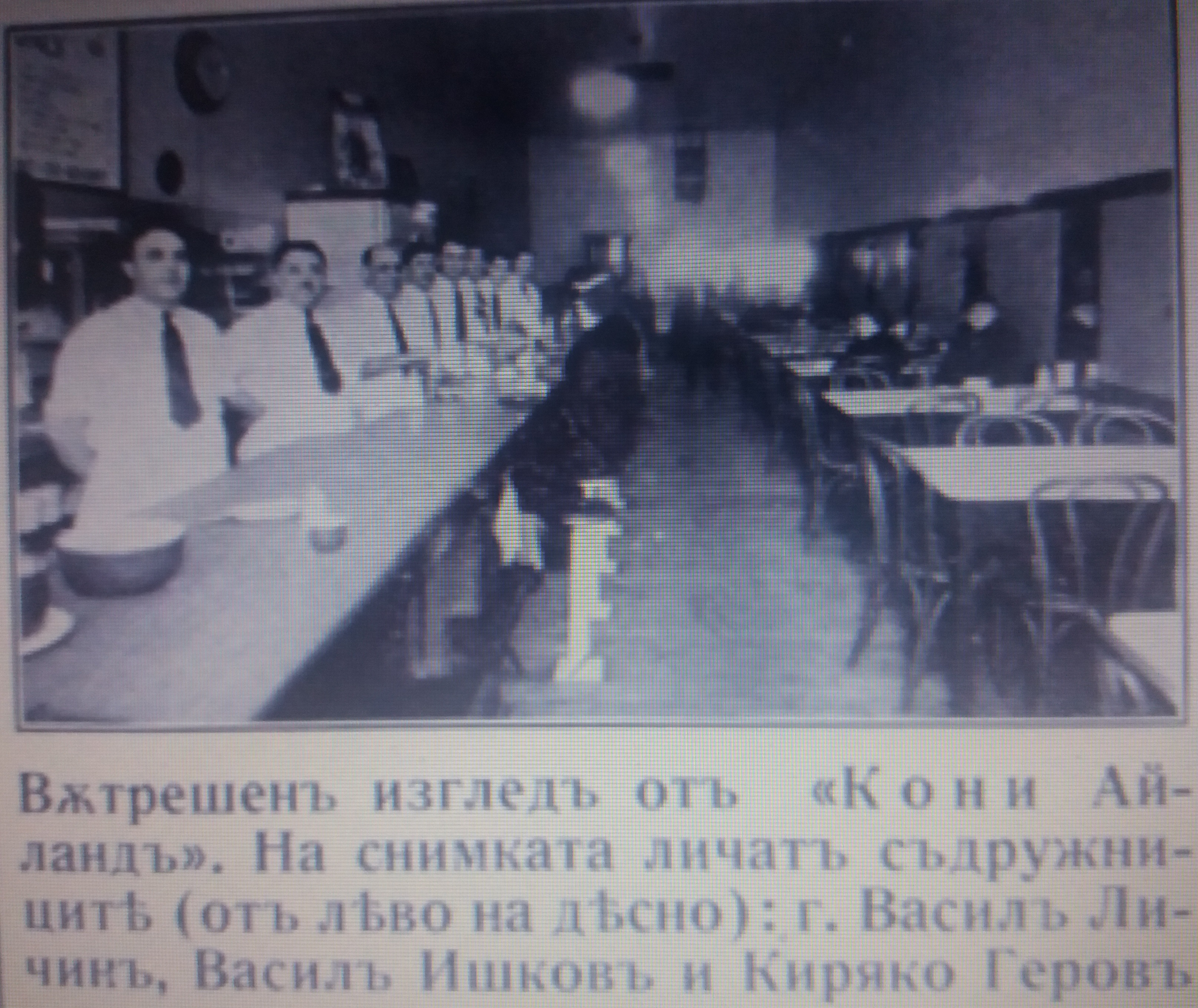
The Coney Island Weiner Stand. The partners from left are: Vasil Litchin, Eshcoff and Kiryak Geroff; (caption in Bulgarian).

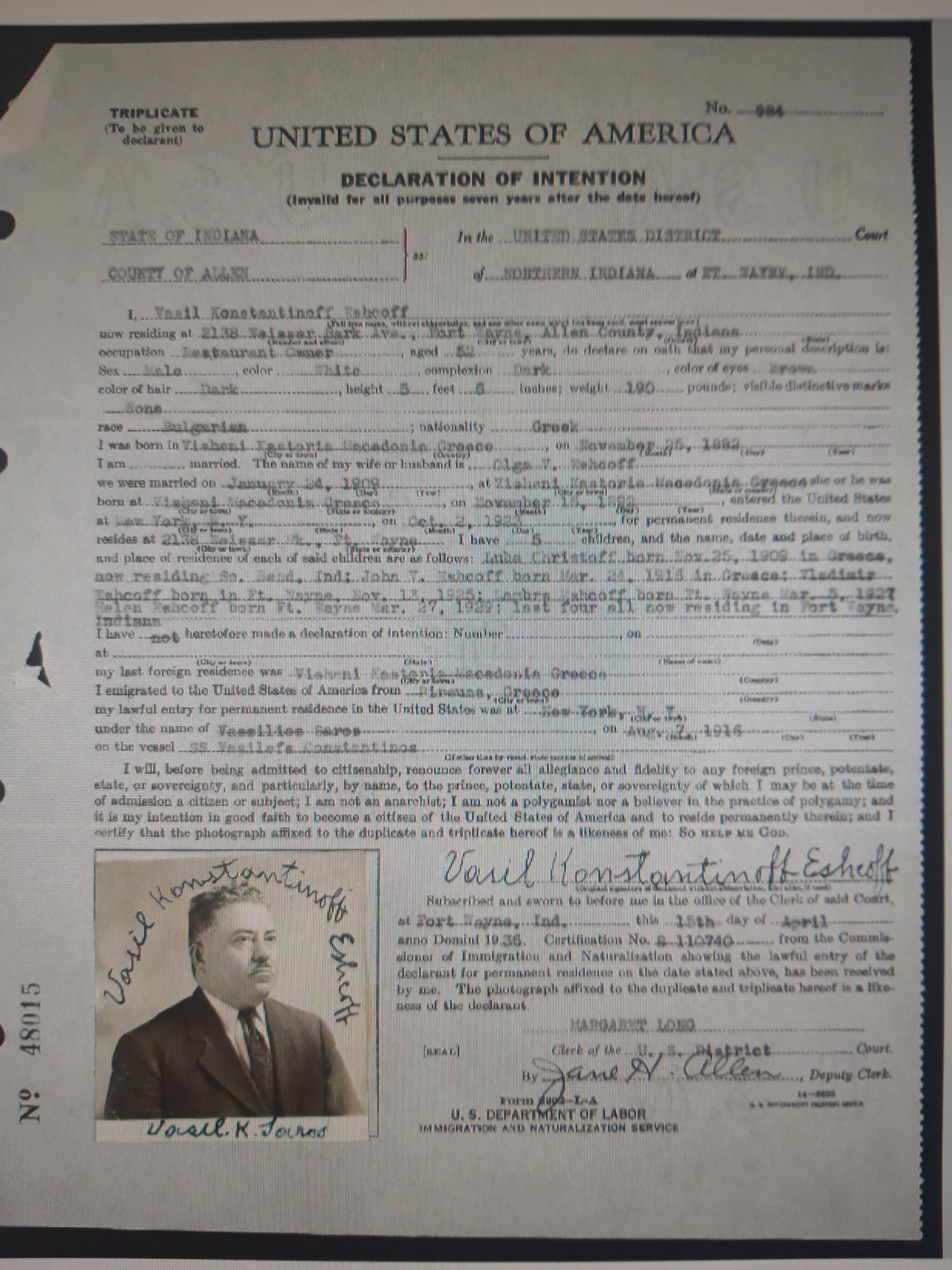
Declaration of intention signed by Eshcoff in 1936 as a step in the process of Naturalization in the United States.

Vasil Kozma Eshcoff was an emigrant from Ottoman Macedonia, known as a pioneer of the Coney Island hot dog in Fort Wayne, Indiana. He was also briefly the second president of the Macedonian Patriotic Organization.

== Biography ==
Vasil Eshcoff was born in 1882 in the Kostur village of Visheni, (Note: In 1897 Visheni was entirely under the jurisdiction of the Bulgarian Exarchate. Both churches in the village, as well as the school, were Bulgarian. According to the statistics of Vasil Kanchov ("Macedonia. Ethnography and Statistics") in 1900 Visheni had 1150 inhabitants, all of them Bulgarian Exarchists.) then in the Ottoman Empire. In 1910 he emigrated to Fort Wayne, Indiana, US, where he was involved in the work of the local Macedonian-Bulgarian society, (Note: According to the article Bulgarians/Macedonians in "Peopling Indiana: The Ethnic Experience." issued by the Indiana Historical Society, where Eshcoff is mentioned too, the early 20th century Macedonian immigrants in the State of Indiana, were pro-Bulgarian oriented in ethnic sense, including MPO, while the separate Macedonian identity was brought en masse by the new emigrants from Communist Yugoslavia at the eve of the 1960s.) founded on November 21, 1921, by settlers from Kostur region. They initiated the establishment of the pro-Bulgarian Macedonian Political Organization in Fort Wayne on October 2, 1922.

At the Second Congress of the Organization, held in Indianapolis in early September 1923, he was elected its president. The governing body also included Atanas Lebamoff (vice president), Mike Kozma (treasurer), Mihail Nikolov (secretary) and Pavel Angelov from Chicago (adviser). Eshcoff was replaced at the next congress held in August–September 1924 in Fort Wayne by Pandil Shaneff.

In Fort Wayne in 1927, the local branch of the MPO established a Macedonian-Bulgarian school and Eshcoff participated in the initiative. He was a member of the Board of Trustees of St. Nicholas Orthodox Church in Fort Wayne, part of the Bulgarian Diocese of Toledo. (Note: At the end of the Second World War, the Macedonian Patriotic Organization in Fort Wayne made efforts to establish a Bulgarian Eastern Orthodox Church. Initially the services were led by the visiting Archimandrite Kiril Yonchev. The first church board included Vasil Lichin, Nikola Gulov, Mihail Kozmov, Argir Lebamov, Dimitar Lebamov, Argir Kiprov, Vasil Ishkov, Toma Lazov and Lazar Laykov. The parish was officially founded in 1947.)

Fort Wayne's Coney Island Weiner Stand, where the famous Coney Island hot dogs are still offered, was developed by Eshcoff and his partners from MPO, Vasil Litchin and Kiriyak Geroff.

He died on June 15, 1961, in Fort Wayne. The restaurant he founded remains in the hands of the Eshcoff and Choka families.

== See also ==
- Slavic speakers of Greek Macedonia
- Macedonian Americans
- Macedonian Bulgarians
