= Mr. Fables =

Restaurant chain

- Type: Private Corporation
- Industry: Fast Food Restaurant
- Founded: 1929; 97 years ago
- Defunct: 2000; 26 years ago
- Fate: Closed
- Headquarters: Grand Rapids, Michigan, USA
- Number of locations: 17 (at peak)
- Area served: Western Michigan
- Products: Burgers, onion rings

Mr. Fables, a DBA of Grand Rapids Innkeepers Management, Inc., was a chain of cafeteria-style family restaurants located throughout Western Michigan. Two cousins formed the chain after taking over the Kewpee Beefburger stand from, dad and uncle, Gerald Boyles. The name "Fables" was the result of putting together the last names of the two cousins: Faber & Boyles. It was known for its olive burgers and secret recipes for Mr. Fables hamburger dressing and onion ring batter. At its peak, the chain had 17 restaurants. Their advertising slogan for many years was "People like Mr. Fables, people like you."

== History ==
In 1929, Gerald Boyles opened a licensed Kewpee location on North Division Avenue in Grand Rapids. Gerald developed two secret recipes for a burger dressing and onion ring batter. In 1963, Gerald's son, John Boyles and his cousin, Dick Faber, purchased Gerald's Kewpee business and renamed it Mr. Fables (Fab+les). In 1988, Boyles and Faber sold the chain including licensing for the secret recipes (provided that they remain secret) to Colonel Chicken, Inc., incorporated by Donald W. Reynolds (later Fables-Innkeepers Management, Inc. then Grand Rapids Innkeepers Management, Inc.). Faber and Boyles hoped the new owner would grow the chain.

Mr. Fables fell victim to the national chains in the late 1990s. While the Fables stores occupied many of the premium real estate locations throughout Grand Rapids, they were sold off piece by piece. Some of those locations were purchased by New Beginnings Family Restaurants. Mr. Fables was one of the original tenants of the Woodland Mall in Grand Rapids and of the Westshore Mall in Holland. In addition to Grand Rapids and Holland, Mr. Fables also operated locations in Grand Haven, Muskegon, Big Rapids, and Benton Harbor over its many decades in business.

The last Mr. Fables closed in 2000.

== Menu ==
They were known for the Deluxe or a Mr. Fabulous. Such that the Filling Station, a member restaurant of the Mr. Burger restaurant business, mimics it with its “Mr. Fabulous Burger”. Harvard Bar and New Beginnings Family Restaurants also attempt to copy the Mr. Fables with olive burgers. They also had kids meals (called a 'Munch Box') with toys.

=== Secret recipes ===
Gerald Boyles developed two secret recipes for the chain when it was still a Kewpee: burger dressing/sauce and onion ring batter. It was distributed by Gordon Food Service and made by Chadalee (now Litehouse Inc.) at its Lowell facility.

- burger sauce: while most assume that it is just mayo and olives, Litehouse would only reveal that it contains eggs and fresh lemon.
- onion ring batter: most employee assume that is Drake's batter and water.

== Return ==
Bill Lewis, Yesterdog restaurant owner and former Mr. Fables employee, apparently owns the Mr. Fables trademark; further, he would be allowed access to the Mr. Fables secret recipes by Boyles and Faber if he wished to restart the Mr. Fables restaurant.
