= Wilson's Sandwich Shop =

Hamburger restaurant in Findlay, OH, USA

Wilson's Inc Of Findlay, Ohio
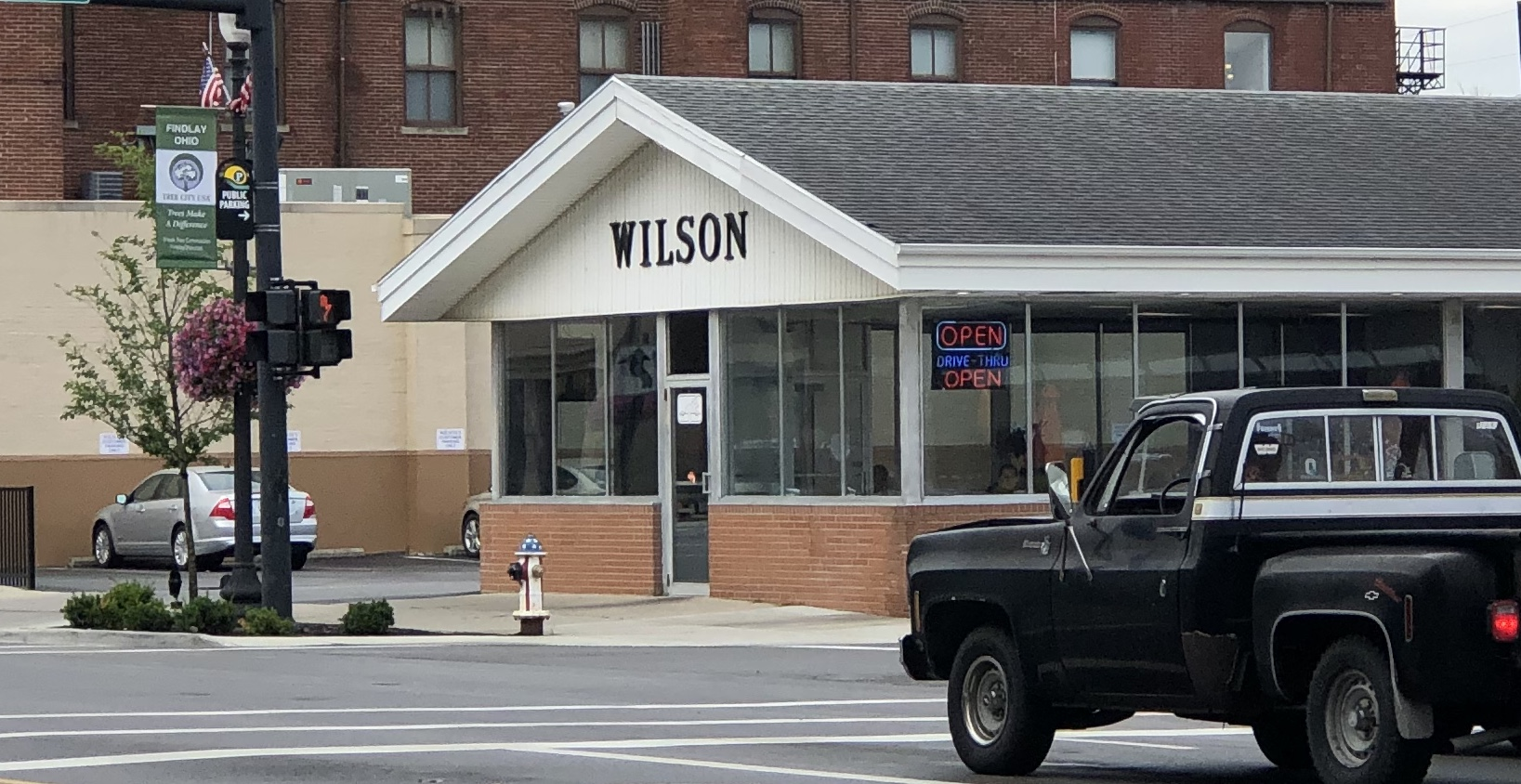
- Trade name: Wilson's Hamburger Shop
- Company type: private corporation
- Industry: Fast Food
- Founded: 1936; 90 years ago
- Founder: Hoyt “Stub” F. Wilson
- Headquarters: Findlay, OH, United States
- Number of locations: 1
- Key people: Pat Baker; (Former President)
- Products: hamburgers, malts, hot dogs
- Owner: Pat Baker (Former); Pam Balmer; Mary Ann Cramer; Wilbur Fenbert (Former)
- Number of employees: 32

Wilson's Sandwich Shop is a restaurant located in Findlay, OH, founded by the owner of the Kewpee Hamburger restaurant in Lima, OH. It is a local institution, known for its square hamburgers, called "hamburgs", and frozen malts. Patrons can get in touch with the community at Wilson's. It is even known as a regular stop for local Courier reporters getting "man-on-the-street perspectives". Various celebrities and politicians have visited throughout the restaurant's history, including singer Johnny Mathis, U.S. Sen. George Voinovich, R-Ohio, former Vice President Dan Quayle, and President Joe Biden (while vice presidential candidate in 2008).

== History ==
In 1936, with a Kewpee already located in Findlay, Ohio, Hoyt “Stub” Wilson, the Lima Kewpee licensee, opened a restaurant in Findlay called Wilson's Sandwich Shop. The original building was yellow and the width of a subway car and could host up to 32 diners. It was an example of the "enamel and steel" road food culture. Due to World War II meat rationing, all three of Hoyt Wilson's restaurants added the "Veggie", a special without the meat patty and a historically notable vegetable sandwich.

Hoyt Wilson's estate sold ownership of Wilson's in the 1960s to three managers: Wilbur Fenbert, Harold "Lance" Baker, and Woodie Curtis. In the mid-1960s, a new building was constructed. The original building stayed open, but was moved to the back of the lot. With the deaths of Baker and Curtis, their spouses took over their ownership interests.

In 2008, then vice presidential candidate Joe Biden stopped at Wilson's while on the campaign trail.

Wilson's faced possible closure in 2009 due to the 2008 financial crisis and OSHA fines for their hamburger patty-molding machine's potential pinching and electrical shock hazards. With training and safety precautions not affordable, then-manager Mike Fenbert ceased using the machine and began purchasing premade patties. By March 2010, a new patty machine was purchased to make the patties in house once again.

By 2011, Maxie Curtis was replaced as an owner by Pam Balmer and her sister, Mary Ann Cramer, joining the other two co-owners. By May 2015, Wilson's changed its menu, adding breakfast items, while dropping shredded chicken, pulled pork, and salad (including slaw) and removing slaw from the "Wilson Dog".

In February 2016, Wilbur Fenbert died.

In August 2019, Pat Baker died.
