= Kewpee =

American fast food chain

Kewpee, Inc.
- Type: Private corporation
- Industry: Fast Food
- Founded: 1923; 103 years ago Flint, Michigan, U.S.
- Founder: Samuel V. Blair
- Headquarters: Lima, Ohio, United States
- Number of locations: 5 Restaurants (2022); 3 corporate 2 franchises
- Area served: Midwest United States
- Key people: Harrison E. Shutt (President; Myrna Shutt (VP); Scott Shutt (VP & GM)
- Products: Fast food, including hamburgers, french fries, pies, and Frozen Malts
- Services: franchising
- Revenue: $6+ million (2009)
- Owner: Harrison E. Shutt
- Website: kewpeehamburgers.com

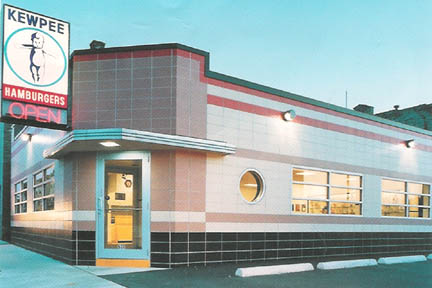
Kewpee in Racine, Wisconsin

Kewpee Hamburgers is the second-oldest chain of hamburger fast-food restaurants, founded in 1923 in Flint, Michigan under the name "Kewpee Hotel Hamburgs". Kewpee's current headquarters is located in Lima, Ohio. The chain is named after the Kewpie doll. Kewpee was one of the first to institute curbside service, which later morphed into a drive-in service, and then finally was transformed into drive-thru service. The Lima Kewpee locations have locally raised beef delivered daily to each Kewpee restaurant. The downtown Kewpee Restaurant in Lima, Ohio is considered a historic site.

== History ==
Kewpee Hamburgers is a chain of fast-food restaurants founded in 1923 in Flint, Michigan, by Samuel V. Blair under the name "Kewpee Hotel" in a stand. In 1926, Blair sold the rights to the Kewpee trademarks to Toledo, Ohio Kewpee Hotel operator Ed Adams.

In Lansing, Michigan, the Weston family has owned and operated the Kewpee's restaurant since it opened in 1923. The Weston family has had as many as two Kewpee restaurants open at one time in Lansing. The Westons are in their fourth generation of operating Kewpee. Kewpee's early plans under Blair and Adams seemed to stay out of major cities. After Prohibition, some Kewpee restaurants added real beer to their staple of root beer, which was on many Kewpee menus joining the standard coffee offerings of other hamburger chains. In 1928, the Lima, Ohio, location opened under the ownership of Hoyt “Stub” Wilson. About 200 Kewpee locations existed by 1929. In 1936, with a Kewpee already located in Findlay, Ohio, Wilson opened a restaurant there called Wilson's Sandwich Shop. At its peak just before World War II, there were more than 400 Kewpee restaurants in operation.

Blair, upon his retirement on April 1, 1944, started renting the original location. Blair died in 1945 and licensees continued to lease their locations and paid royalties for use of the Kewpee name from Adams. The Blair estate owned locations went up for sale in 1958. The original location was sold to leaser William "Bill" V. Thomas with Thomas paying license fees to Ed F. Adams's Kewpee Hotels partnership of Toledo, Ohio. About 1958, Harrison "Harry" E. Shutt went to work for Wilson at his Lima restaurant. In 1963, the Grand Rapids licensee locations were sold and separated from Kewpee as Mr. Fables.

Ed Adams' partnership, Kewpee Hotels transferred the Kewpee trademark to Kewpee Hotel Systems, Inc. in 1965 of which Ed Adams was president. The number of Kewpee locations dropped considerably in 1967 when the Kewpee Hotel Systems, Inc. demanded a full franchising arrangement and a percentage of the profits. The locations which objected either closed or changed their names. The original Flint location changed its name to Bill Thomas' Halo Burger which is still a thriving business, but not at the original location which was torn down in 1979. After Edwin Adams died in 1974, his widow Hortense M. Adams took over as president of Kewpee Hotel System, Inc. by March 1975. In 1969, a Kewpee International partnership, (later most likely incorporated as Kewpee of Toledo) led by former Kewpee Hotel System Vice President Robert L. Dame, purchased the Kewpee rights from Kewpee Hotel System, Inc. The Kewpee, Inc. was formed in 1969 by Harold J., James F. and Richard E. Meredith based in Lima, Ohio. Upon the closing of Kewpee's operations in Toledo, the owner of Kewpee in Lima, Ohio acquired the Kewpee trademarks in 1985. "The Kewpee, Inc. of Toledo" assigned the trademark of Kewpee to "The Kewpee, Inc." Shutt became president in 1970 of Kewpee, Inc. and purchased Wilson's Lima location upon Wilson's death in 1980.

According to a 2001 interview with Dave Thomas, the founder of Wendy's, as a child, he lived near the intersection of Douglas and Kalamazoo Avenue in Kalamazoo, Michigan. Thomas used to love eating at a Kewpee restaurant, which stood at Burdick and South. He said it was what inspired him to go into the business. Kewpee's sold square hamburgers and thick malt shakes, much like the famous restaurant that Thomas eventually founded in Columbus, Ohio, in 1969.

In January 2010, Kewpee was named to the National Restaurant News 50: All-American Icons list, and the Lima City Council passed a resolution congratulating the company.

A book about Kewpee's history titled Kewpee Hamburgers: A Mity Nice History became available on July 24, 2023.

Harrison Shutt died in 2024.

== Slogans ==
Their advertising slogan is: Hamburg pickle on top, makes your heart go flippity-flop!

Earlier Slogans

- "Mity Nice Hamburger".
- "Your Granpappy ate here"
- "We cater to all the folks"
- "Hamburg Pickle On Top! Makes Your Heart Go Flippity Flop!"

== Locations ==
There are five remaining Kewpee restaurants. Three of these are in Lima, Ohio.

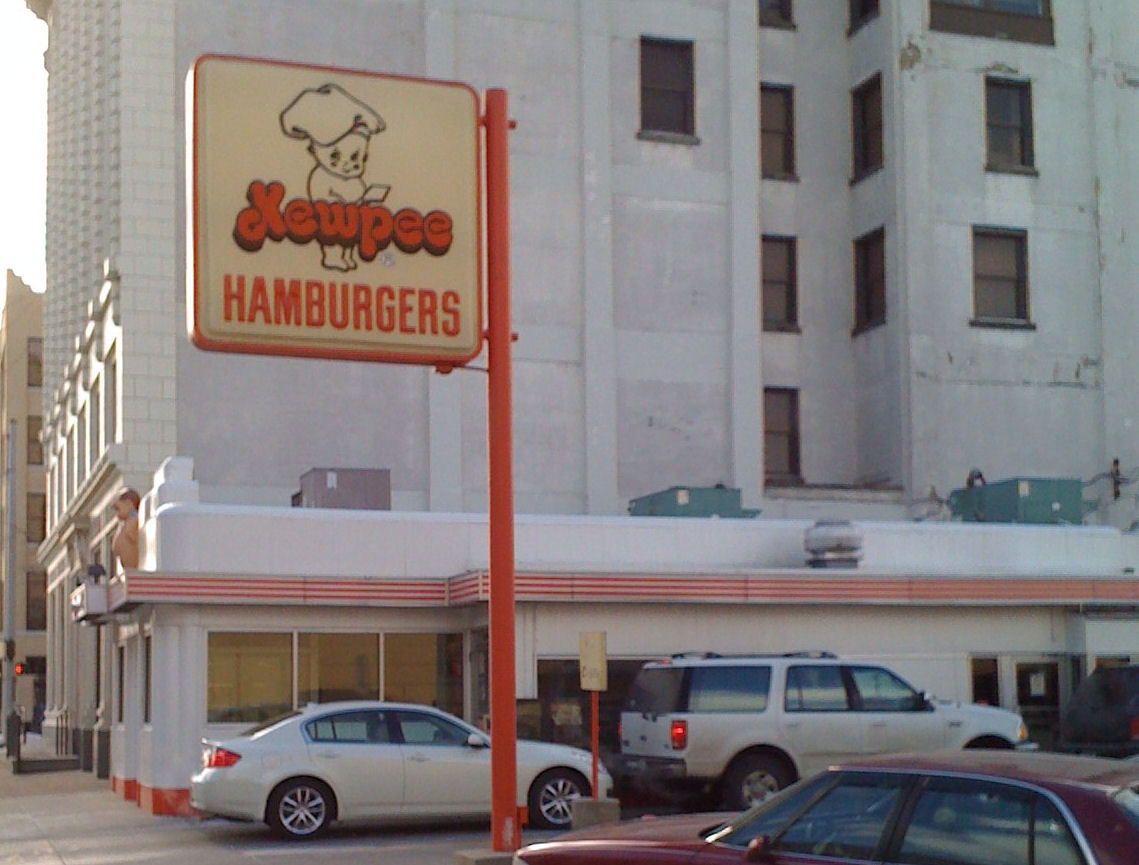
The Kewpee sign at the downtown Lima, Ohio, location

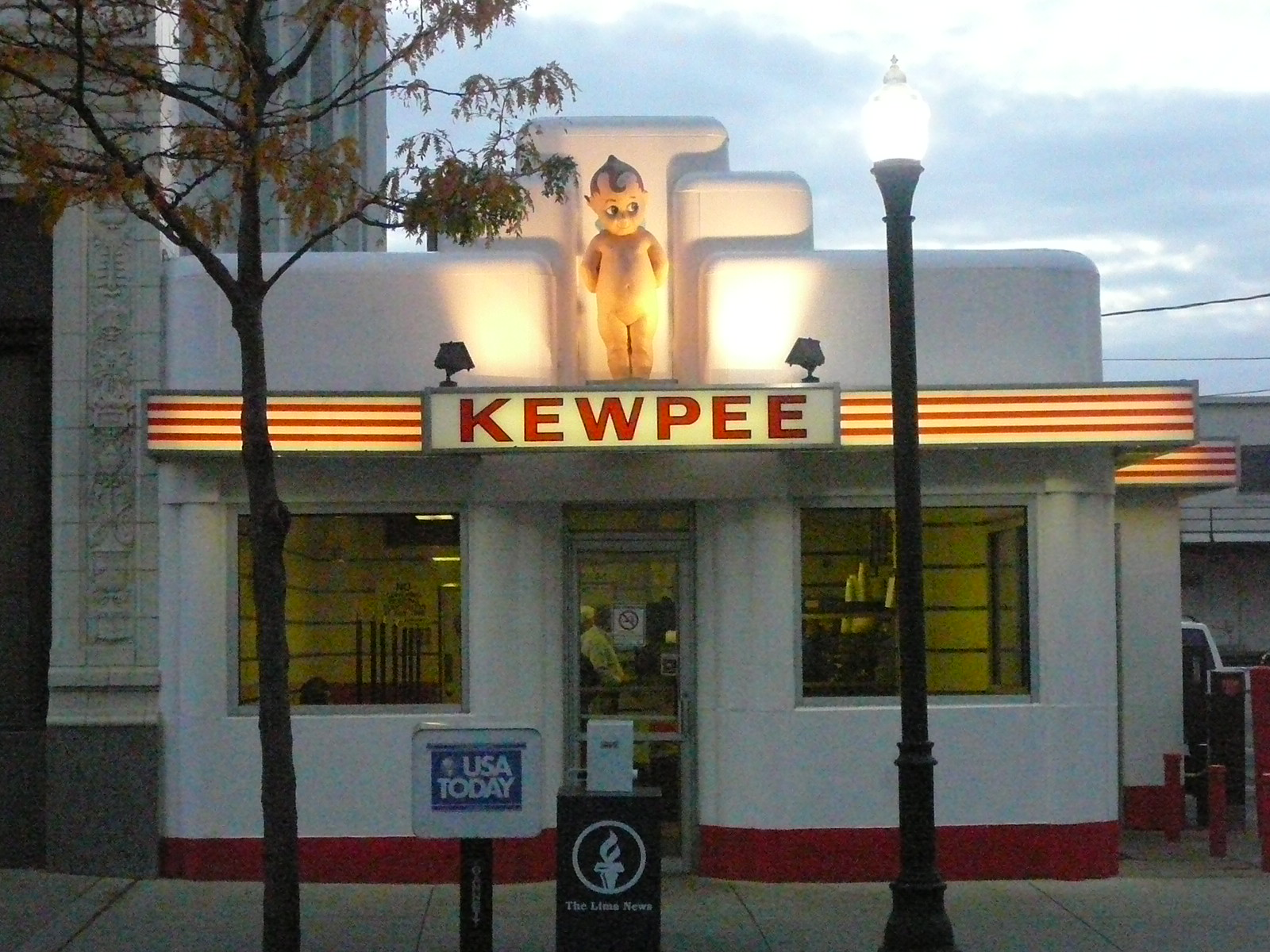
Kewpee in downtown Lima, Ohio

- Kewpee Hamburgers Downtown – located in Lima, Ohio and also known as Kewpee Downtown, it opened under the ownership of Stub Wilson in 1928 as a Kewpee franchise. The architecture of the Kewpee is Streamline Moderne, featuring porcelain enamel and stainless steel. The building was approved for listing on the National Register of Historic Places in 1982 but was marked as Owner Objection and does not appear on the register.
- Kewpee Hamburgers West
- Kewpee Hamburgers East

In addition, Racine, Wisconsin and Lansing, Michigan each have one Kewpee restaurant. The Lansing location is named Weston's Kewpee Sandwich Shop.

== See also ==
- List of hamburger restaurants
