= Abbott's Meat =

- Company type: Private
- Industry: Food processing
- Founded: 1907; 119 years ago
- Area served: Flint/Tri-Cities; Lansing
- Key people: Ed Abbott (CEO)
- Products: Meat products
- Website: www.abbottsmeat.com

Abbott's Meat is a meat packing company located in Flint, Michigan. Koegel's hot dogs are considered by the authors of "Coney Detroit" as only acceptable hot dog for a Flint-Style Coney Dog along with Abbott's coney sauce. Abbott's chili sauce's primary ingredient is ground beef heart.

== History ==
Abbott's Meat started in 1907 on the University of Michigan-Flint parking ramp's future site. When the Flint-style coney began in the 1920s, Abbott's began making coney sauce.

In July 2007, Abbott's Meat, had voluntarily recalled 26,600 pounds of meat products due to a possible E. coli contamination. E. coli was detected by regular testing with no reported illnesses. All Halo Burger locations were shut down for a day due to the recall.
