= Dortch Enterprises =

American restaurant operator

Dortch Enterprises, LLC
- Company type: Private LLC
- Industry: Restaurant
- Founded: 1987; 39 years ago
- Founder: Louis Dortch Sr. Louis Dortch Jr.
- Headquarters: Grand Blanc Township, Michigan, United States
- Number of locations: 45 (2019)
- Area served: Central Michigan
- Key people: Louis Dortch Sr. (Chairman); Louis Dortch Jr. (President/CEO); Polly Dortch (marketing director); Matt Barcey (Vice president of operations)
- Products: Sub sandwichs Tacos
- Services: Restaurant equipment repair
- Owner: Louis Dortch Sr. Louis Dortch Jr.
- Number of employees: 1,200
- Subsidiaries: Dortch Subway Groups; Fix My Restaurants, LLC; Great Lakes Taco
- Website: dortchenterprises.com

Dortch Enterprises, LLC (DE) is a company in the restaurant business as a Subway and Taco Bell multiunit franchise operator and formerly owned the Halo Burger chain. Dortch was only one of 38 out of the 17,000 Subway franchisees worldwide that owns 40 or more locations. The company as of August 12, 2019 has 21 Subway and 24 Taco Bell locations.

== History ==
The Louis Dortch family started out in the dry cleaning business with Troy Cleaners, now owned by other family members. Louis Dortch Sr. and Louis Dortch Jr. decided to expand from the dry cleaning business and opened a Flint Subway location in 1987. The duo followed with four more location in 13 months.

The company also became a franchisee of Qdoba Mexican Grill. Their first Qdoba was opened in Grand Blanc in 1998. An additional 14 locations in Genesee, Oakland, and Wayne counties would be built by 2008. In November 2008, Qdoba purchased Dortch's franchised locations. With the increasing number of Subways in the state and the sale of the Qdoba franchise, Dortch looked for another brand to expand in Michigan. Dortch originally settled on being a Sonic Drive-In franchisee.

By 2010, DE owned 40 Subway locations. Dortch Enterprises had negotiated for property for a Sonic location in Dearborn and had Planning Commission approval for a Livonia Sonic location in March 2010. At the end of 2010, Dortch purchased the nine location Halo Burger chain for about $10 million which led to them ending their Sonic franchisee.

In 2011, Dortch Subway Groups opened three more locations by June. In August 2012, Dortch filed and received approval for a site plan for a joint Halo Burger-Subway location on Belsay Road in Burton.

2013 was a building blitz year for Halo Burger with nine more locations under constructions with three opening by October, one of which was the joint Halo Burger-Subway location.

While Dortch Subway Groups was up to 65 locations in October 2013 for a net gain of 22 locations from 2011. By October 2014, Dortch moved their Milford and Highland Subway stores to new locations at both ends of Milford. The two stores were opened in 2004 and later purchased by Dortch with the understanding that both would have to be moved. Dortch Enterprises sold the 15 location Halo Burger chain to Halo Country LLC in January 2016.

Dortch was revealed to be a Taco Bell franchisee, when in August 2017, a Taco Bell Cantina location, the first for Michigan, was announced for Royal Oak, Michigan that Dortch would operate. Dortch also indicated they would open 10 additional locations in the next year. Dortch Enterprises had purchased 24 Taco Bell restaurants, including the Cantina. Its alcohol license for the Cantina became by April 2018 an issue with the police given the number of license in the central business district and the cost food of Taco Bell would attract underage patrons. The license was not granted on April 23 by the city commission. In August 2019, the building's foundation and site work was finished for its Durand Taco Bell with plans to open in October.
