= Koegel Meat Company =

US meat company based in Flint, Michigan

- Company type: Private
- Industry: Food production distribution
- Founded: 1916; 110 years ago
- Founder: Albert Koegel
- Headquarters: Flint Township, Michigan, U.S.
- Number of locations: 1
- Area served: Michigan, Ohio, Indiana, Illinois, Kentucky
- Key people: Albert Koegel, Jr. (chairman); John C. Koegel (president); Kathryn Koegel (vice president)
- Products: wholesale meats products
- Owner: Koegel family
- Number of employees: 85
- Website: koegelmeats.com

The Koegel Meat Company is a meat processing, packaging, and distribution company based in Flint, Michigan. Koegel's produces 35 products. Koegel's hot dogs are considered by the authors of "Coney Detroit" as the best hot dog for a Flint-style coney dog, served with Abbott's Meat's coney sauce. Koegel is also a supplier of A&W, about 200 Coney restaurants, Walmart, Dairy Queen and Kroger. Distribution of its own products to each store gives Koegel an advantage of being able to give a shorter shelf life, at half its competitors, to ensure a fresh product.

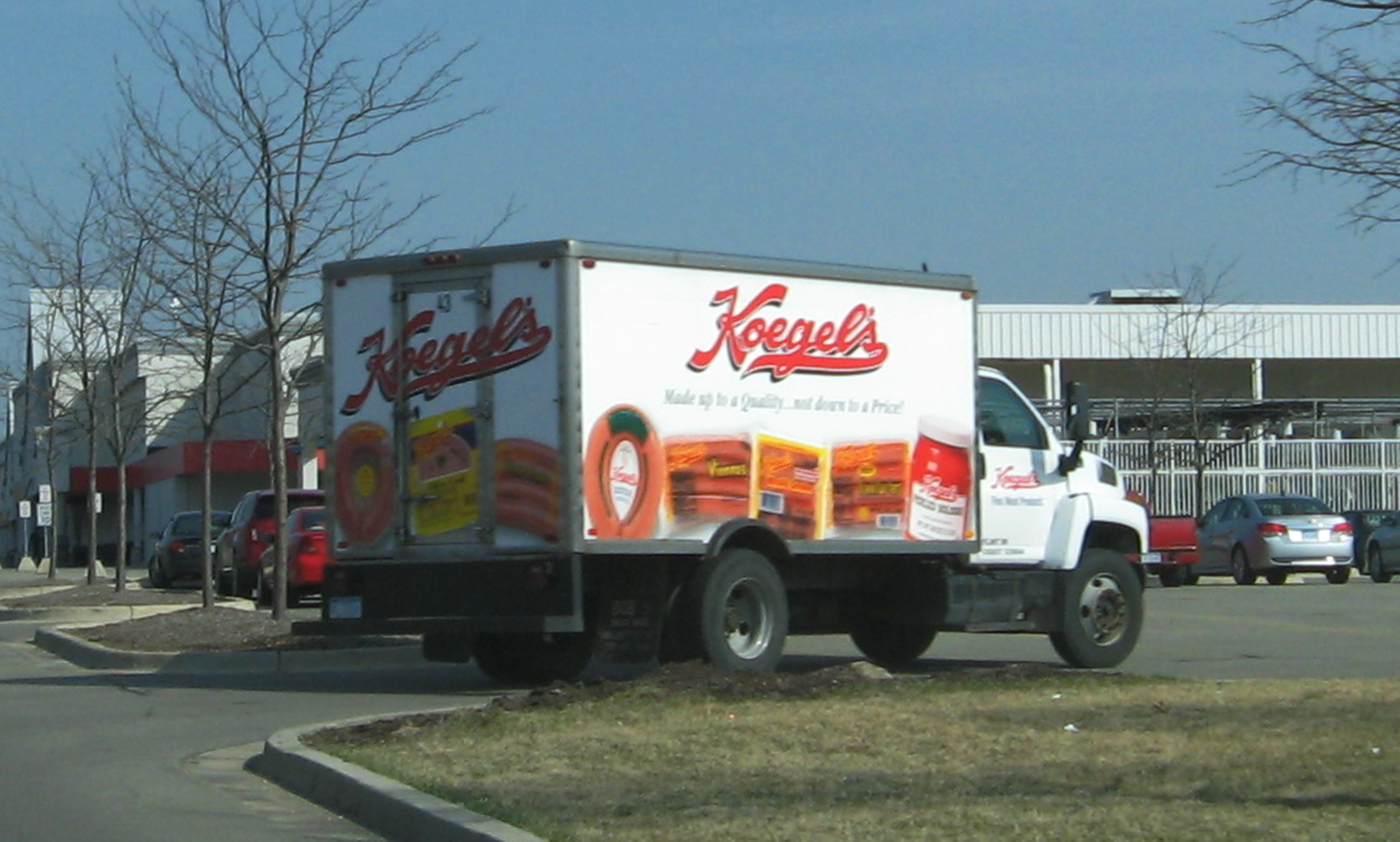
Koegel's delivery truck, Pittsfield Township, Michigan

== History ==
Albert Koegel learned meat cutting and developed various recipes while in his native Germany. The company was founded in 1916 by Koegel on Kearsley Street, Flint, as a retail market to take part in the expanding population due to the automotive industry starting up. Production was upstairs to the retail area. To keep up with the regional demands, Koegel opened a processing plant in the mid-1930s on Stevens Street at the Flint River. In 1972, the company operations were moved to Bristol Road, Flint Township.

Koegel's made news when the Michigan Jobs Commission awarded an economic development package to one of Koegel's competitors, Boar's Head Provision Company, in 1998. While Boar's Head is a New York company, it was awarded a large incentive, paid with taxpayer money, to open a processing plant in Michigan. Al Koegel, the son of company founder Albert Koegel, claims that Koegel's has never accepted taxpayer money or tax breaks from the state.

In 2007, Michigan locations of Costco started carrying Koegel products. In 2008, Koegel's discontinued two products, a honey-style loaf and ham. President John Koegel told the press that in previous years, a couple of truckloads of the ham product would be sold per annum, but declining sales forced its discontinuation. With the downturn of the Great Recession, Koegel sales increased over first couple of years as people prepared meals at home more. Beef prices rose after that cutting into the profits.

In 2012, Koegel and Meijer agreed to a distribution deal placing Koegel products in Meijer store in other states, Ohio, Kentucky, Indiana, and Illinois while keeping direct distribution to Michigan Meijer stores. Keeping Michigan distribution allows their drivers to keep their jobs and retain other customers like A&W, Dairy Queen and Kroger. Previous, the company's products were only available in Michigan and Toledo, Ohio. This deal added 98 new retail outlets for four to six products with two, hot dogs and bologna, being the core products.

A few years before 2016, Koegel was selling nationwide by mail order as far away as Alaska. Koegel Meats was given the 2015 Al Kessel Outstanding Achievement Award by the Michigan Grocers Association. In January 2016, Koegel had to answer multiple inquires, in regards to the Flint water crisis and their water supply, that their plant is not connected to the Flint City water system, but the county run system via Flint Township.

== Factory ==
Built in 1972, the current factory is on Bristol Road in Flint Township. Features of the plant include:

- production moves east to west with no circling back to decrease instances of contamination
- The production area floor included bricks as a meat's acid would erode a concrete one over the years
- 100,000 square feet
- the ceilings, equipment and the walls are stainless steel

== Products and recipes ==
The Koegel Meat makes 64 products based on 32 different recipes. This including 16 types of sausage and hot dogs: brats, foot-longs, franks, vienna frankfurters, bologna rings, chicken frank and Polish sausage. Lunch meat products include bolognas, cotto salami, olive loafs, pickle loafs, head cheeses and mac & cheese loaf. Also they make coneys and hot dog chili products.

Koegel uses its original 100-year old recipes that the meat products are smoked with damp sawdust with hardwood for flavor and in its own blend of spices Processes have changed over the 100 years moving from hand stuffing to machine based operation.
