= Coney Island (restaurant) =

Type of American restaurant

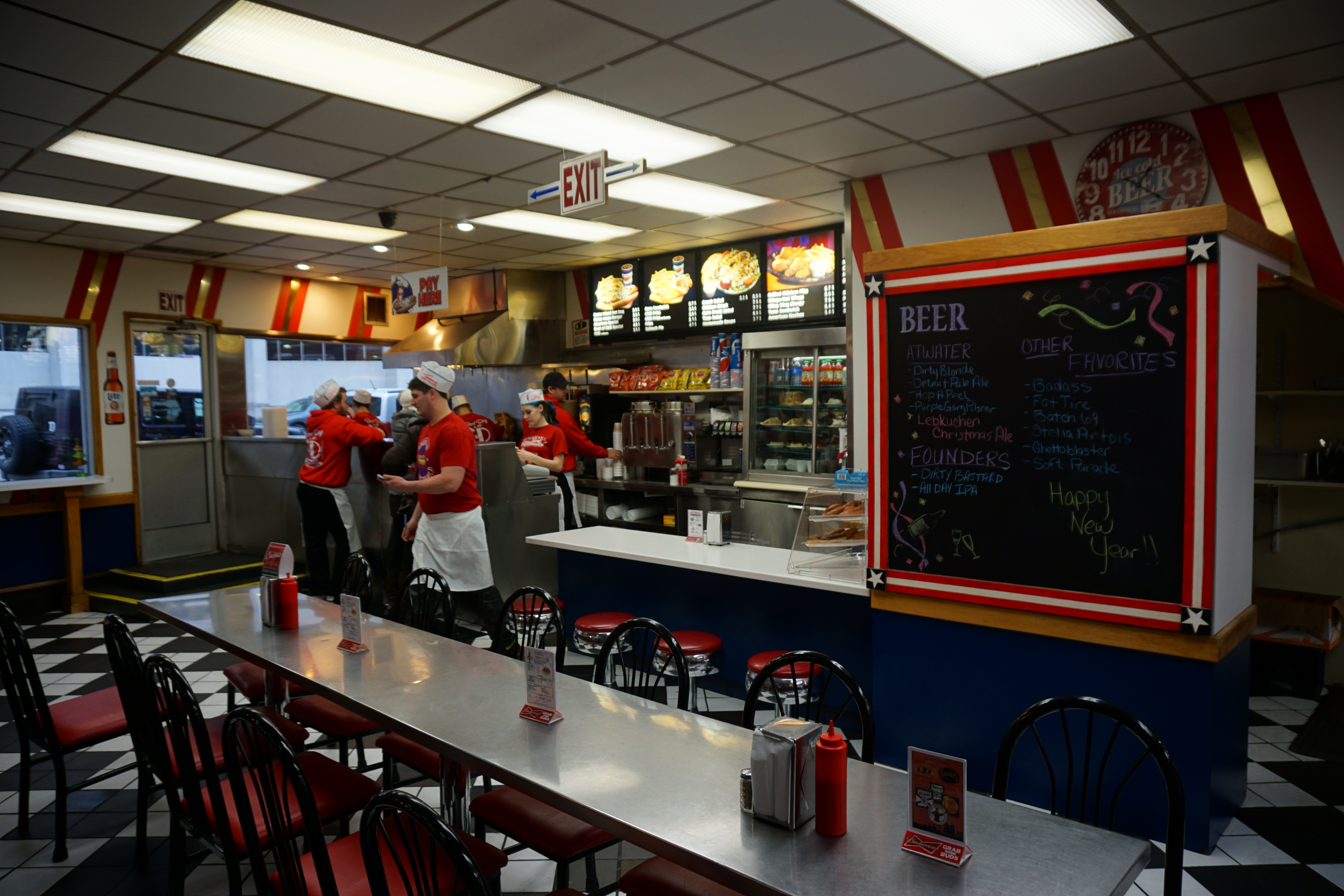
The interior of American Coney Island in Detroit in 2015

A Coney Island is a type of restaurant found primarily in the northern United States, especially in Michigan. Coney Island restaurants serve a distinctive menu centered around Coney Island hot dogs, Greek-American dishes, and traditional diner fare.

== Origins ==
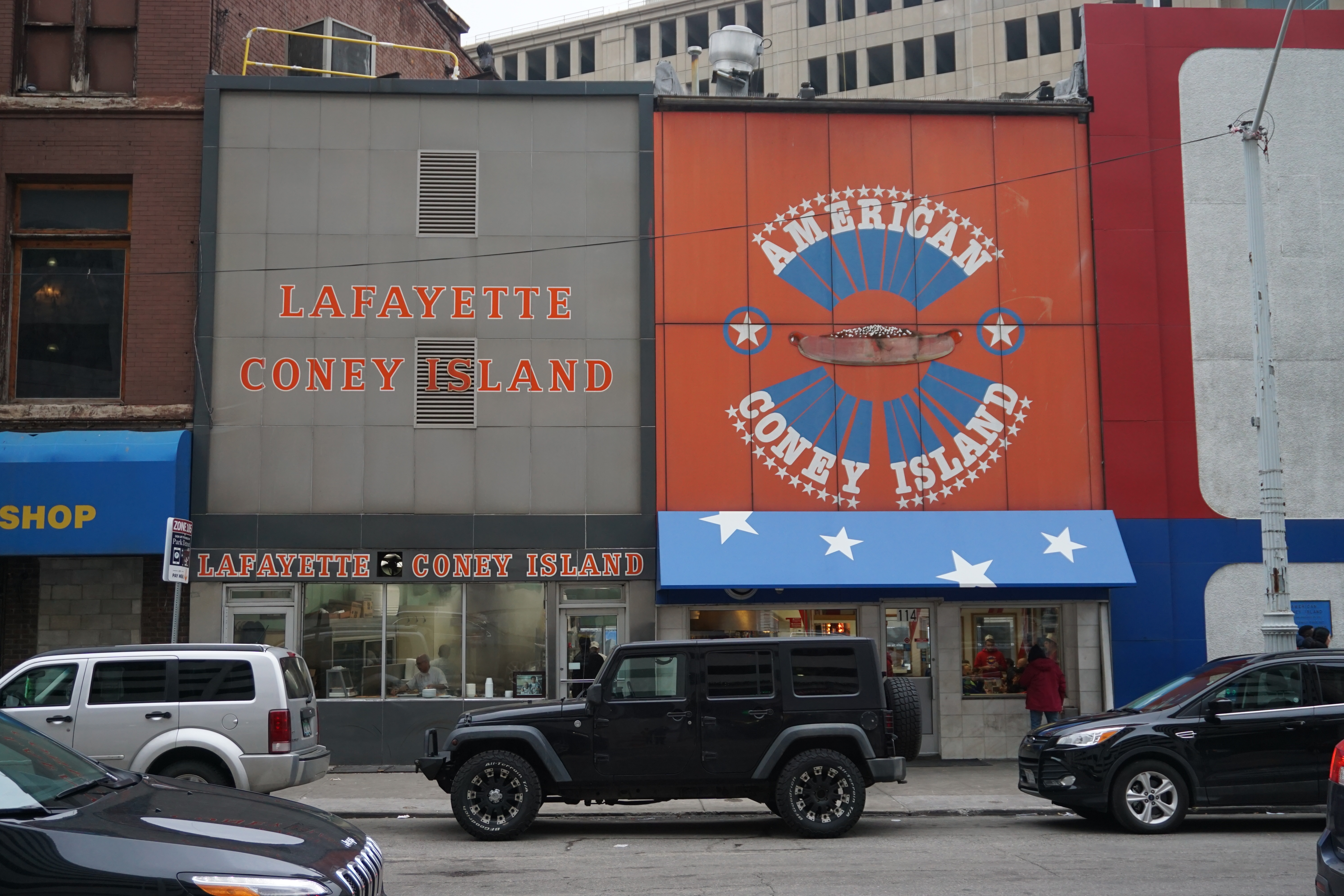
Lafayette and American Coney Islands in Detroit in 2015

In the early 1900s, the Coney Island hot dog was spread throughout the eastern United States by Greek and Macedonian immigrants. "Many of them passed through New York's Ellis Island and heard about or visited Coney Island, later borrowing this name for their hot dogs, according to one legend," wrote Coney Detroit authors Katherine Yung and Joe Grimm. The founding date and location of the first Coney Island restaurant is contested, with several establishments in Michigan and Indiana claiming to be the first. An early example is Jackson Coney Island, opened in 1914 in Jackson, Michigan, by Macedonian immigrant George Todoroff, though it was not known by that name until 1931. Despite these early founding dates, no Coney Islands appeared in city directories until the 1920s.

There are some 500 Coney Island restaurants in Metro Detroit alone, the two best-known being Lafayette Coney Island and American Coney Island, located in adjacent buildings in downtown Detroit and considered "ground zero" for Coney dogs. Smithsonian magazine illustrated the conflicting origin stories typical of Coney Islands vying for historical bragging rights:

Brothers William "Bill" Keros and Constantine "Gust" Keros, former sheepherders from the Greek village of Dara, founded the two diners to serve hot dogs to autoworkers. Each restaurant boasts it opened first, with American Coney staking a claim to a 1917 founding, Lafayette Coney to 1914. But city directories tell a different story than family and business oral history: the Coney Detroit authors say the brothers opened Lafayette Coney together in 1923, and Gust Keros opened American Coney in 1936 after a falling-out with his brother.

Coney Islands are found throughout Michigan, including in Jackson, Flint, and Kalamazoo, all of which have their own local variants of the Coney dog. A smaller number of Coney Islands are also found in such states as Indiana, Florida, Pennsylvania, and Massachusetts.

== Menu ==
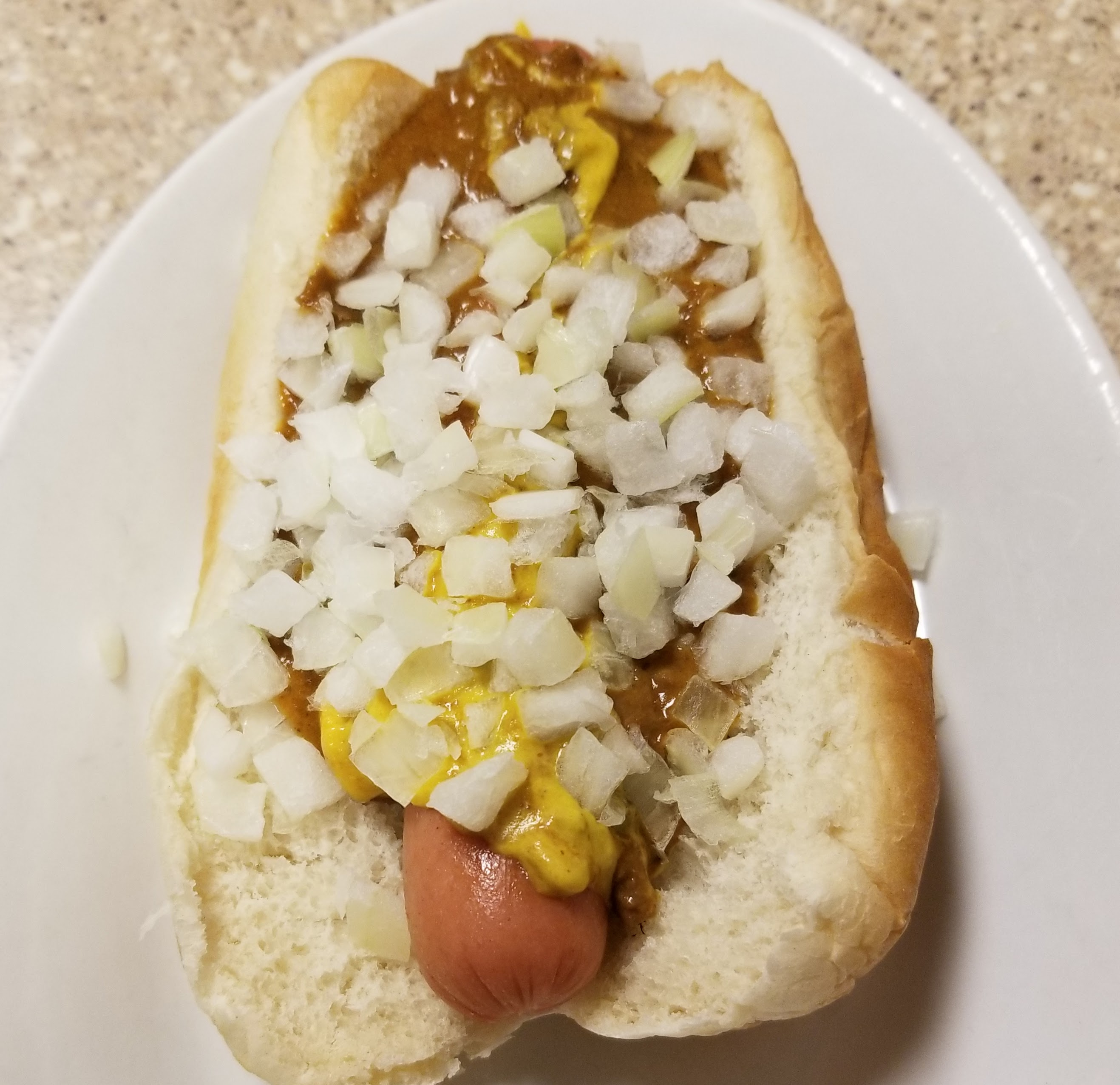
Detroit-style coney

The menu of all Coney Island restaurants centers on the Coney Island hot dog—known simply as a "Coney"—which is a grilled natural-casing hot dog in a steamed bun, dressed with beanless chili, diced onions, and yellow mustard. Another common item is the "loose burger," consisting of crumbled ground beef in a hot dog bun, covered in the same condiments as a Coney dog.

Most Coney Islands also offer Greek and Greek-American dishes, such as gyros, souvlaki, kebabs, avgolemono, saganaki, and Greek salads, as well as traditional American diner fare, such as hamburgers, sandwiches, breakfast items, and desserts.

== Restaurant chains ==
=== James Coney Island ===
James Coney Island is a Houston, Texas-based chain of fast food restaurants that specializes in Coney Island hot dogs.

=== Leo's Coney Island ===
The Leo's Coney Island chain was founded by Peter and Leo Stassinopoulos, nephews of Bill and Gust Keros, the founders of American and Lafayette Coney Islands. Peter and Leo opened the first Souvlaki Coney Island in 1972 in Southfield, Michigan. In 1988, the name Leo's Coney Island was given to its newest location in Troy, Michigan, and the chain was subsequently rebranded under that name. The brothers began franchising in 2005 and are now the largest Coney Island chain in the world.

Leo's uses buns from the Metropolitan Baking Company and the coney sauce is their own recipe manufactured by the Milton Chili Company located in Madison Heights. The natural casing hot dogs are supplied by the Koegel Meat Company.

=== National Coney Island ===
National Coney Island is a Roseville, Michigan-based chain that specializes in Greek-American cuisine. It has more than 20 locations in Metro Detroit.

== In popular culture ==
Detroit's American Coney Island and Lafayette Coney Island have both been featured on episodes of Travel Channel shows Man v. Food and Food Wars.

In 2013, food and travel television host Anthony Bourdain visited Duly's Place Coney Island in Detroit for an episode of Parts Unknown. After finishing two Coney dogs, he said, "Every time I visit Detroit, somebody asks me if I've had a good Coney yet. Apparently, I never had a great one. I finally got one. I understand now."

== See also ==
- Coney Island hot dog
- List of Greek restaurants
