= Vyssinia =

- Community
- Location within Greece
- Country: Greece
- Geographic region: Macedonia
- Administrative region: Western Macedonia
- Regional unit: Kastoria
- Municipality: Kastoria
- Municipal unit: Vitsi

Population (2021)
  - Community: 97
- Time zone: UTC+2 (EET)
  - Summer (DST): UTC+3 (EEST)

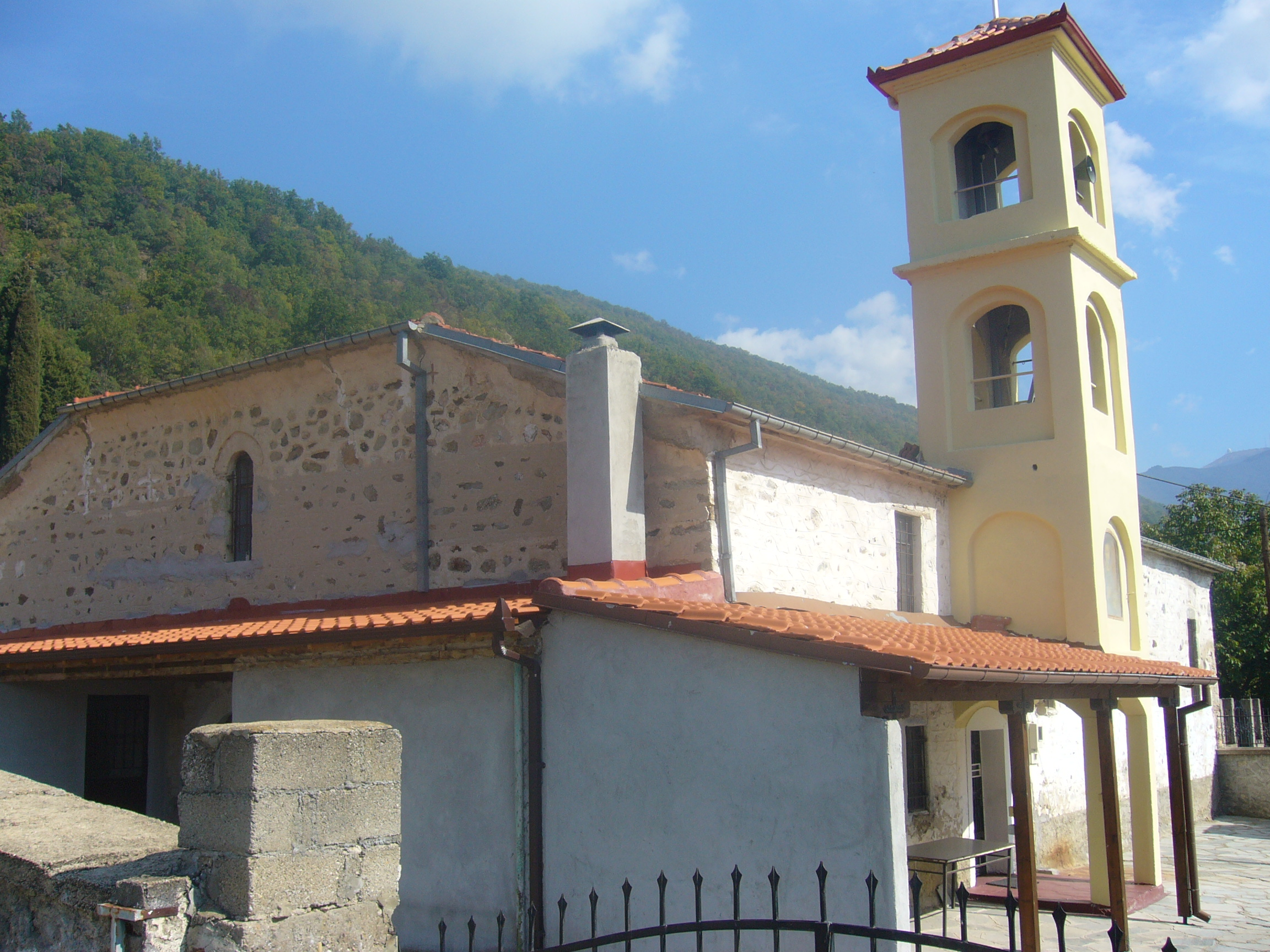
The old village church in Vyssinia, Kastoria Prefecture, Greece

Vyssinia (Greek: Βυσσινιά, before 1926: Βύσανη – Vysani) is a village and a community in Kastoria Regional Unit, Macedonia, Greece.

In 1945, Greek Foreign Minister Ioannis Politis ordered the compilation of demographic data regarding the Prefecture of Kastoria. The Vyssinia had a total of 664 inhabitants, and was populated by 650 Slavophones with a Bulgarian national consciousness.
