= Coney Island hot dog =

American fast food item

Coney dog
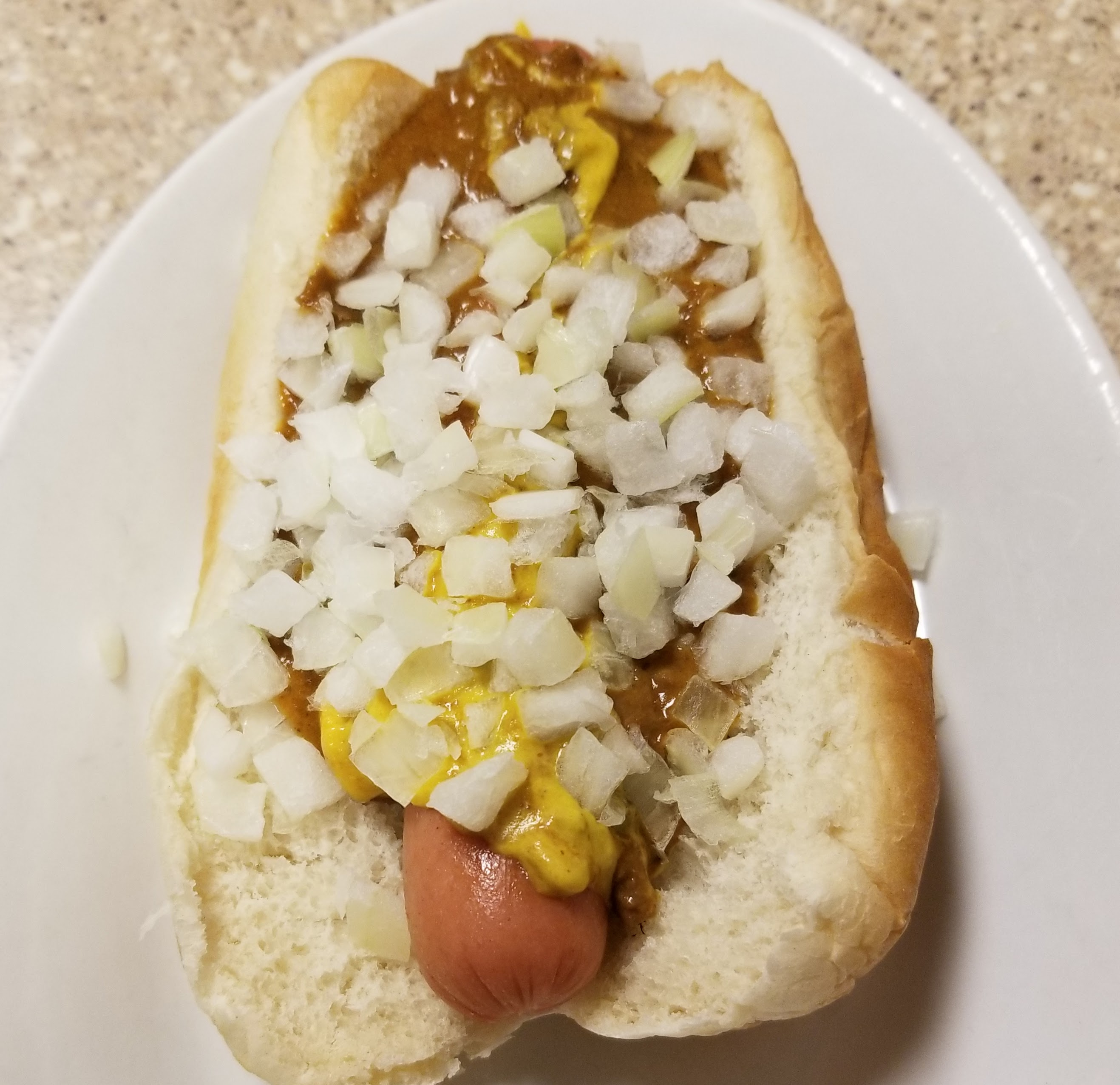
- A Coney dog
- Course: Main course
- Place of origin: United States
- Region or state: Midwestern United States
- Serving temperature: Hot
- Main ingredients: Wiener, or a beef or beef and pork European-style Vienna sausage with lamb or sheep casing, topped with a meat sauce made of seasoned ground beef or beef heart, topped with yellow mustard, white onion and sometimes cheese.

A Coney Island hot dog, Coney dog, or Coney is a wiener in a bun topped with a savory meat sauce and sometimes other toppings. It is similar to a chili dog and is often offered as part of a menu of classic American diner dishes and at Coney Island restaurants. Despite its name and association with New York, it is most popular in the Midwestern United States, especially in Michigan. It was invented by early 20th century immigrants from Greece and the Ottoman region of Macedonia to the United States.

== Origin ==
"Virtually all" Coney Island variations were developed, apparently independently, by groups of European immigrants in the early 1900s, many fleeing the Balkan Wars, who entered the US through Ellis Island in New York City. Family stories of the development of the dishes often included anecdotes about visits to nearby Coney Island. The origin of the style is somewhat murky: there were parallel developments in New York, Michigan, Ohio, and elsewhere around the United States, especially where there were concentrations of immigrants from the Balkans.

The first documented European name for the island is the Dutch name Conyne Eylandt or Conynge Eylandt. This would roughly be equivalent to Konijn Eiland using modern Dutch spelling, meaning Rabbit Island. The name was anglicized to Coney Island after the English took over the colony in 1664, coney being the corresponding English word. The hot dog's fame later spread from this part of Brooklyn, New York, where Nathan Handwerker, a Polish Jewish immigrant, was an early entrepreneur who sold them at his stand in Coney Island. His business was later named "Nathan's", an iconic brand that remains popular as both a fast-food chain and as a grocery product. The alternate name for a hot dog—a "Coney," most likely derived from the positive regional and national publicity Nathan's began to generate.

== Regional and local varieties ==
=== Indiana ===
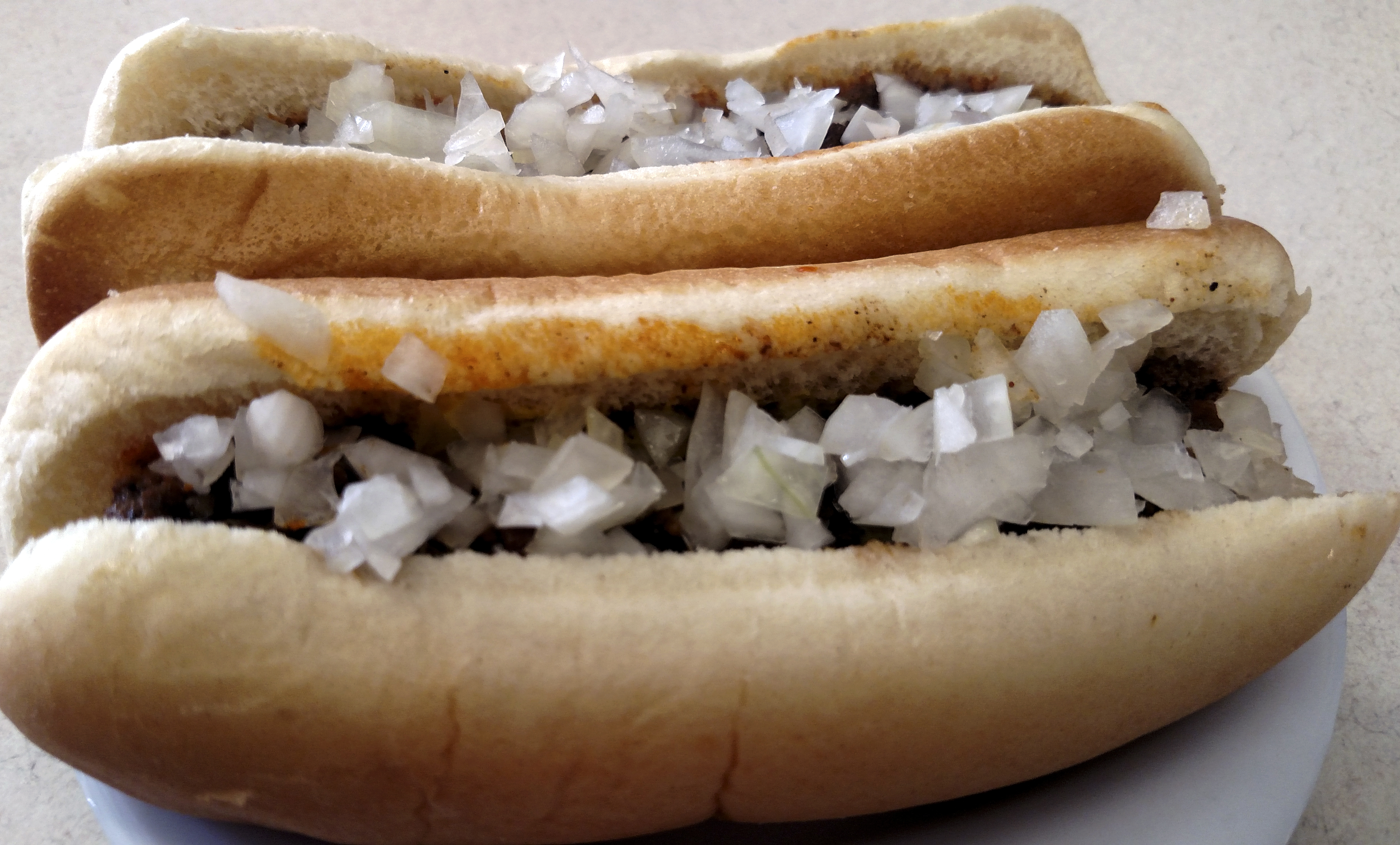
Coney Islands at Fort Wayne's Famous Coney Island Wiener Stand

Fort Wayne's Famous Coney Island Wiener Stand was opened in 1914 by Harry Dorikis, James Samaras and Stilos Papas, three immigrants from Greece. Vasil Eshcoff, another immigrant, purchased an interest from one of the original owners in 1916. Eschoff's descendants operated the restaurant until 2014, when the now-owner, James "Jimmy" Todoran II, bought 50 percent of the business. The Coney Island in Fort Wayne is described as a small, fatty pink hot dog with a "peppery sweet" coney sauce on a soft bun. However, the ground beef-based coney sauce at Fort Wayne's Famous Coney Island Wiener Stand has the flavor and consistency of a mild peppered savory pork sausage. The small hot dog is grilled on a flattop and placed in a steamed bun; yellow mustard and a few teaspoonfuls of the savory chili sauce are added and topped with chopped white onion.

=== Michigan ===
Jane and Michael Stern, writing in 500 Things to Eat Before it's Too Late, note that "there's only one place to start [to pinpoint the top Coney Islands], and that is Detroit. Nowhere is the passion for them more intense." James Schmidt, in a debate at the 2018 National Fair Food Summit, noted that "Detroit is synonymous with the Coney Dog: you simply cannot have one without the other."

The Coney Island developed in Michigan is a natural-casing beef or beef and pork European-style Wiener Würstchen (Vienna sausage) of German origin, topped with a beef heart-based sauce, one or two stripes of yellow mustard and diced or chopped onions. The variety is a fixture in Flint, Detroit, Jackson, Kalamazoo, and southeastern Michigan. The style originated in the early 20th century, with competing claims from American and Lafayette Coney Islands (1917) in Detroit, and Todoroff's Original Coney Island (1914) in Jackson. The longest continuously operated Coney Island (in the same location) is in Kalamazoo (1915).

==== Detroit-style ====
The most influential chili dog stands in Michigan are the American Coney Island and Lafayette Coney Island restaurants, located next door to each other in downtown Detroit. The American Coney Island restaurant was founded in 1917 by Greek immigrant Constantine "Gust" Keros. Gust brought his brother over from Greece, who opened a spite store location called Lafayette Coney Island next door in 1924. There is a fierce rivalry between the two restaurants. The Lafayette Coney Island is no longer owned by a member of the Keros family. American Coney is owned and operated by a third-generation Keros.

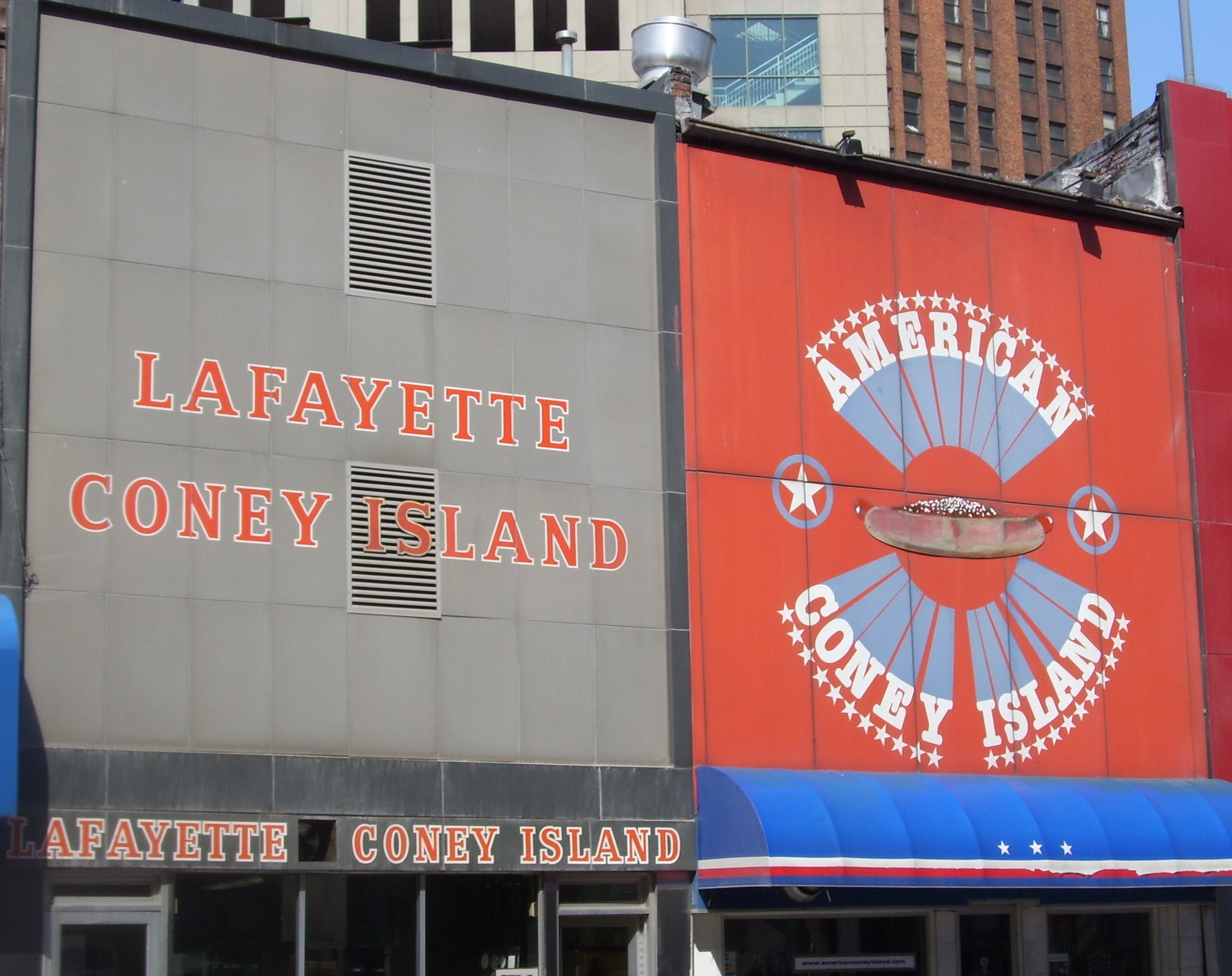
Competing neighboring Coney restaurants in Detroit. The American Coney Island (right) was founded by Greek immigrant Constantine "Gust" Keros. Gust brought his brother over from Greece and helped him open the Lafayette Coney Island (left) restaurant next door.

In Detroit, historically many Greek and Macedonian immigrants operated Coney islands, or restaurants serving Detroit Coney dogs. By 1975, many Albanians began operating them as well. The Greeks established Onassis Coney Island, which has closed. Greek immigrants established the Coney chains Kerby's Koney Island, Leo's Coney Island, and National Coney Island during the 1960s and early 1970s. All three chains sell some Greek food items with Coney dogs. Detroit-style sauce is a beanless chili sauce, differing from the chili dogs they offer only in the lack of beans. National has most of its restaurants on the east side of the city, and Kerby's and Leo's have the bulk of their restaurants on the west side of the Detroit area.

==== Flint-style ====
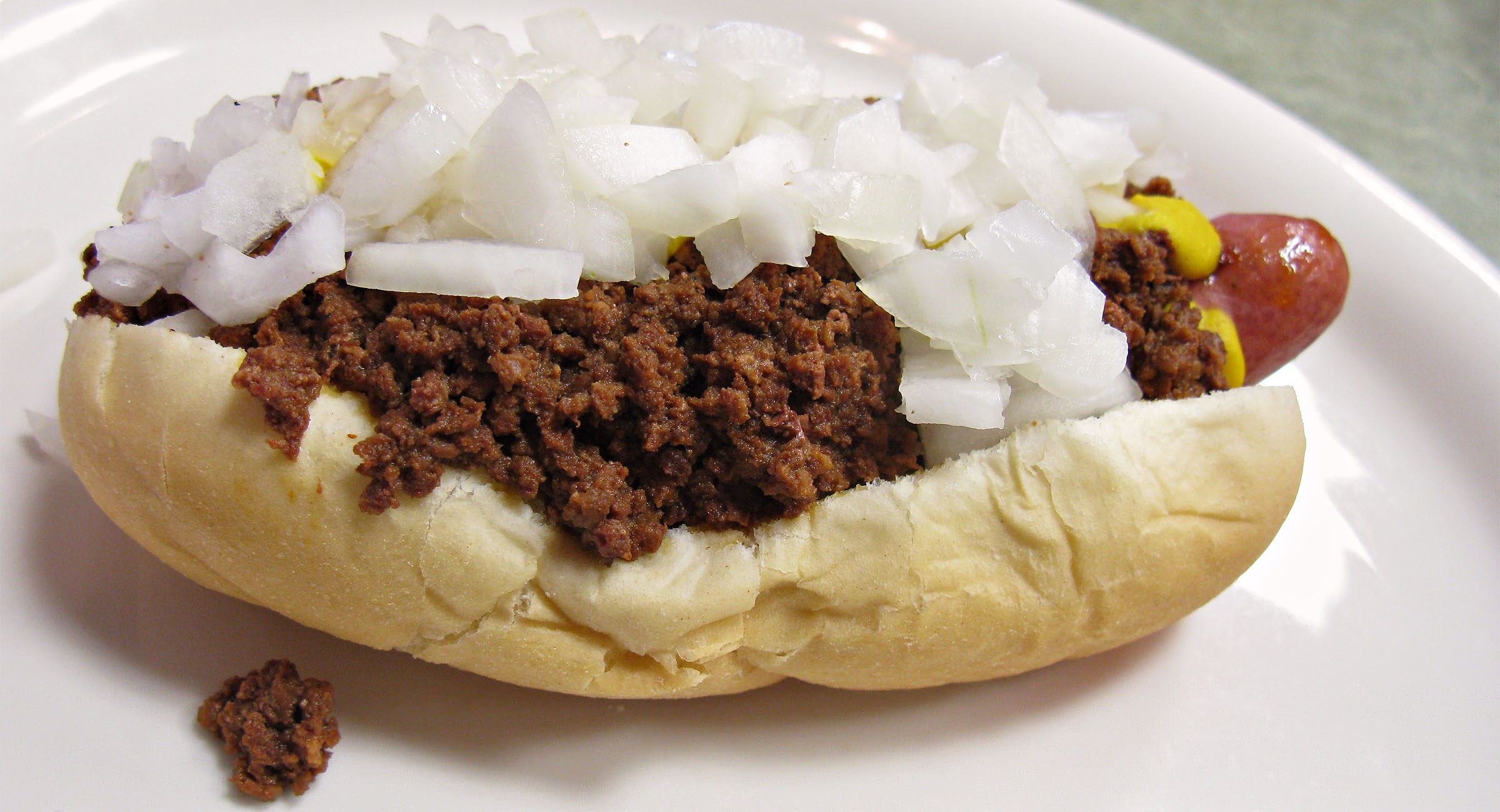
A Flint-style coney (with dry coney sauce) at Rio's Coney Island in Flint

Flint-style coneys are characterized by a dry hot dog topping made with a base of ground beef heart, which is ground to a consistency of fine-ground beef. Some assert that in order to be an "authentic" Flint coney, the hot dog must be a Koegel coney and the sauce by Angelo's, which opened in 1949. However, the sauce was originally developed by a Macedonian in 1920, George N. Brown for his Flint's Original Coney Island restaurant. Brown contracted with Koegel Meat Company to make the coney Flint's Original Coney Island still makes, also contracting with Abbott's Meat to provide the fine-grind beef heart sauce base. Abbott's still makes Brown’s 1924 sauce base available to restaurants and the public through the Koegel Meat Company and Abbott's Meat. Restaurants then add chopped onions sautéed in beef tallow, along with their own spice mix and other ingredients, to Abbott's sauce base to make their sauce.

Popular folklore perpetuates a legend that a Flint coney sauce recipe containing ground beef and ground hot dogs is the "original" Flint Coney sauce recipe. Variations on this story include either that a relative of the storyteller knew or worked with the former owner of Flint's Original and received the recipe from them, the family of George N. Brown does not have the recipe, it was a secret and was to have remained that way. Someone who wanted to capitalize off the name Flint Original leaked the so called recipe to the Flint Journal. Ron Krueger, longtime food writer of the Flint Journal, included it in a collection of recipes from the newspaper but without a cited source, unlike the rest of the recipes in the collection. Krueger explained, "That recipe appeared in The Journal several times over the years. [I don't] think I ever saw it in the context of a story or ever saw any attribution. It always included the word 'original' in the title, but anybody who knows anything knows otherwise." As to the second story, George passed away in 1967 and his wife passed in 1992, without ever leaking the recipe to anyone as she herself did NOT know it. The actual source of this recipe appears to be an earlier Flint Journal food editor, Joy Gallagher, who included the recipe in her column of May 23, 1978, in which she stated she had included the recipe in an even earlier column. Her apparent source was "a woman who said she was the wife of a chef at the original Coney Island, and that she copied the recipe from his personal recipe book." Gallagher stated, "I believe her". However, Gallagher also wrote, "I'm not making any claims". In the same column, Gallagher also included a second recipe that used beef heart, which she wrote "came to me recently from a reader who swears it is the sauce served at Angelo's." The folklore has mixed the supposed sources of the two recipes in this column from Gallagher, with people claiming the ground hot dog recipe is reportedly from Angelo's. In his column published in the Flint Journal on April 18, 1995, food editor Ron Krueger reported taking Gallagher's ground hot dog recipe directly to Angelo's co-owner Tom V. Branoff, who refuted the recipe line-by-line. Gallagher's pre-1978 column is still being researched.

==== Jackson-style ====
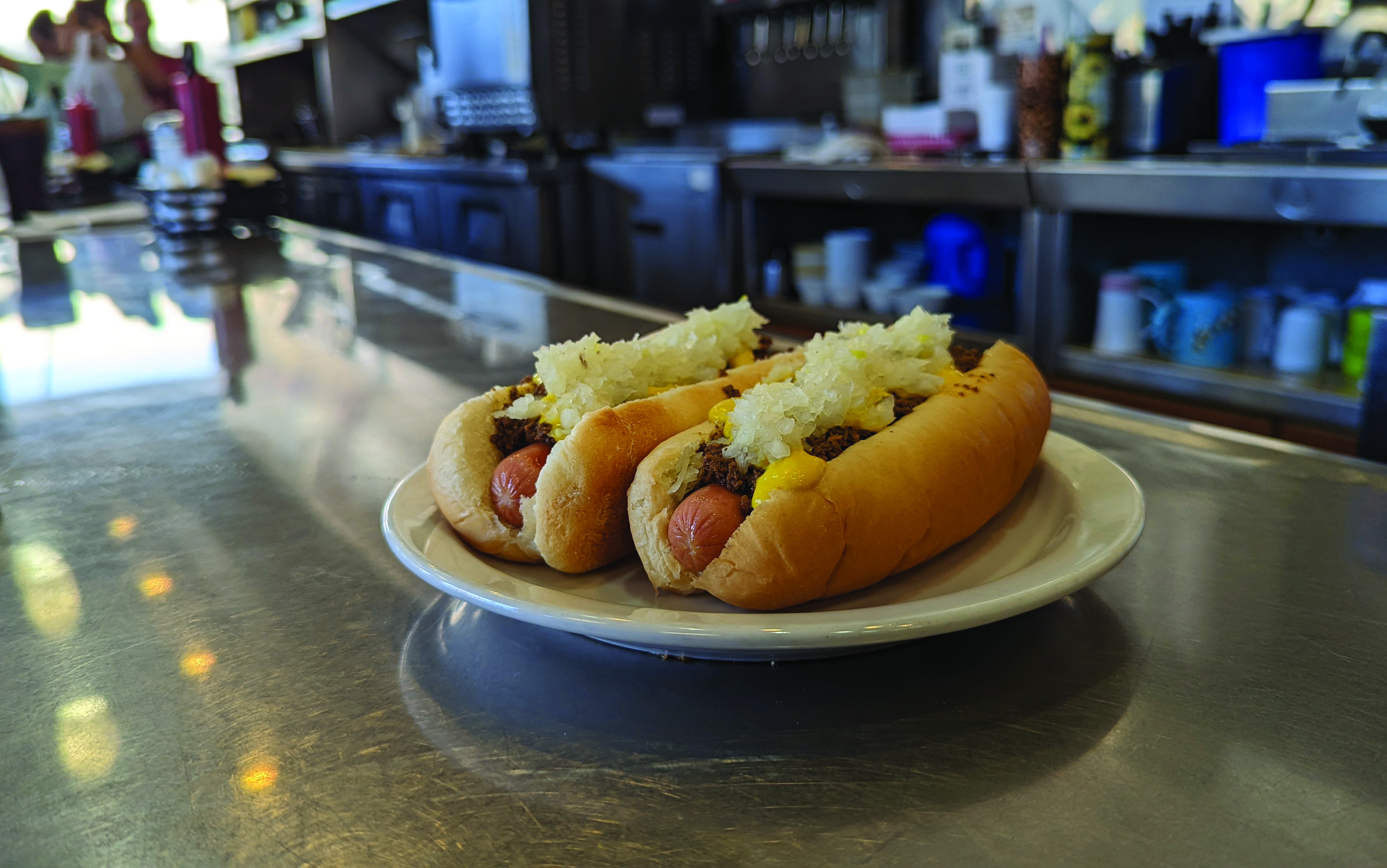
A classic Jackson-style coney dog.

In 1914, Macedonian immigrant George Todoroff founded the first "Coney Island restaurant" in Jackson and created his famous Coney Island hot dog topping. He opened his first stand, Todoroff's Coney Island, in front of the Jackson train station to serve passengers and locals.

A key feature of the Jackson coney is its sauce, which is a meat sauce made from ground beef heart. This was not the original recipe; Todoroff's sauce was originally made with ground beef. The switch to ground beef heart occurred during World War II as a result of beef rationing. The new recipe proved popular, and it became the defining characteristic of the Jackson-style coney, which is still served today.

While Todoroff's original stand is no longer in operation, the tradition is continued by other local restaurants, such as Virginia Coney Island and Jackson Coney Island, which are still located near the train station.

==== Kalamazoo-style ====
Coney Island Kalamazoo was founded in 1915, and is the longest continuously operated Coney Island in the state. Their coney island is made up of a topping made from their own recipe served on a Koegel's skinless frankfurter. Koegel's was not founded until 1916, and it is unknown which hot dog Coney Island Kalamazoo used prior to the skinless frankfurter's development.

==== Suppliers ====
The following meatpackers provide Coney dogs and European-style Vienna sausage (Frankfurter Würstel) to restaurants and consumers in Michigan:

- Dearborn Sausage Co., primary supplier in Detroit
- Koegel Meat Company, Flint area primary supplier

Many Coney Island restaurants make their own sauces from scratch. However, the different styles of sauces are also available from the following meatpackers:

- Abbott's Meat: Flint-style made with ground beef heart
- National Chili Co., primary metropolitan Detroit supplier
- Detroit Chili Company (owned by American Coney Island): Detroit-style

=== Minnesota ===
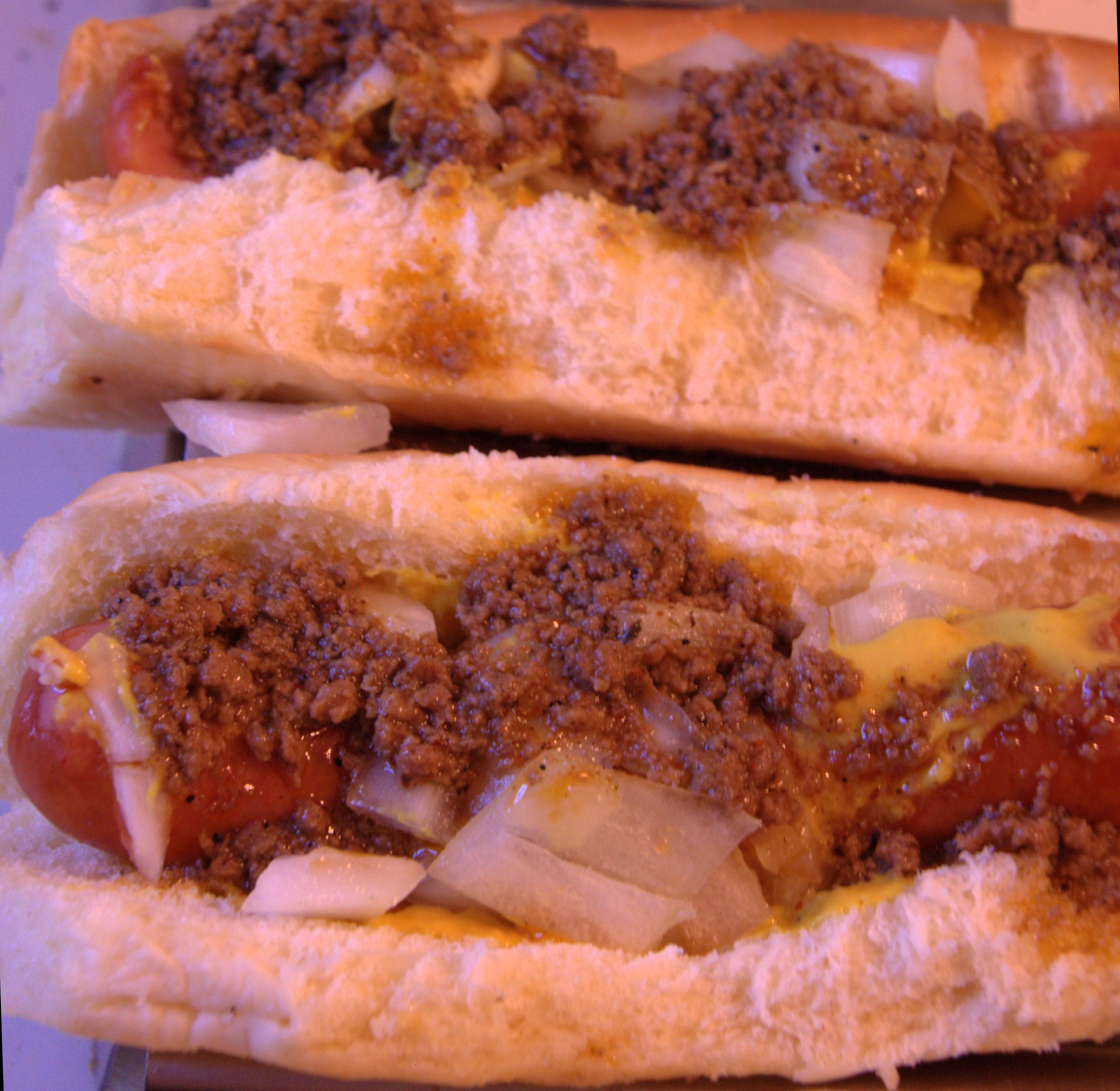
Hot dogs from the Original Coney Island Restaurant and Bar in St. Paul, Minnesota

Greek immigrant Gus Saites opened his Original Coney Island in Duluth in 1921. The hot dog used is the Vienna Beef from Chicago, which is topped with the restaurant's own coney sauce, with options of mustard, onion, and, for a small fee, cheese. The Superior Street location also offers sport peppers as a topping. The decor includes a copy of their 1959 menu showing that coney islands were 25 cents each.

The Original Coney Island Restaurant and Bar, operated by the Arvanitis family since 1923 in a former Civil War armory, is the oldest remaining business in St. Paul, though now open only on special occasions.

=== Ohio ===
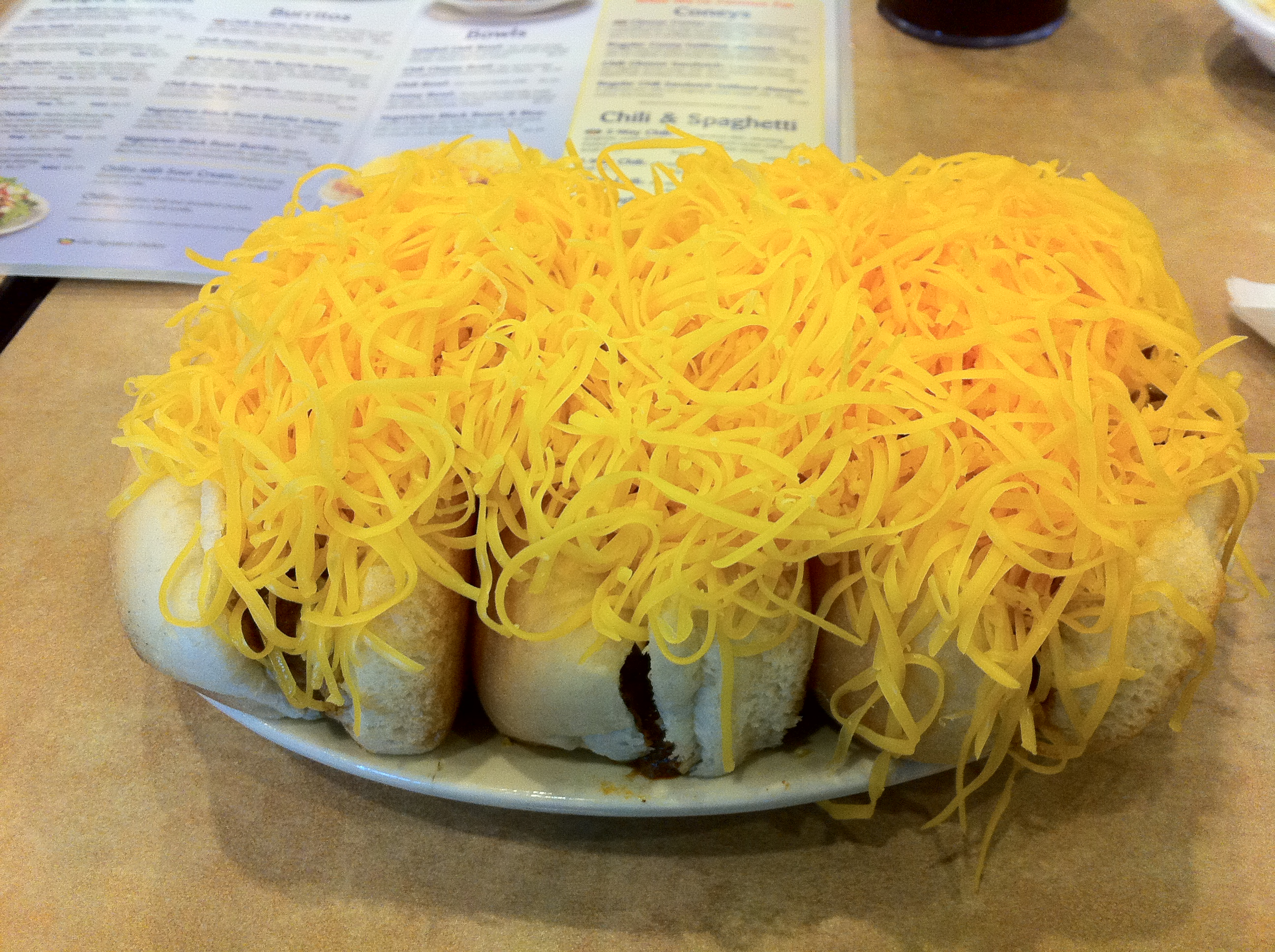
Cheese coneys from Cincinnati

In Cincinnati, a "coney" is a hot dog topped with Cincinnati chili, usually with mustard and chopped onions. A "cheese coney" adds a final topping of shredded cheddar cheese. The dish was developed by immigrants Tom and John Kiradjieff, founders of Empress Chili, in 1922. The coney topping is also used as a topping for spaghetti, a dish called a "two-way" or chili spaghetti. As of 2013, there were over 250 "chili parlors" in Cincinnati serving coneys. The two largest chains today are Skyline Chili and Gold Star Chili.

Tony Packo's serves a similar dish of a beef and pork sausage topped with chili sauce and originally served on rye. The creation became known as the "Hungarian hot dog"; no such dish is known in Hungarian cuisine.

=== Oklahoma ===
Coneys are on restaurant menus throughout Tulsa and were originally created there by Greek immigrant Christ Economou in 1926 at his world famous Coney Island Hot Weiners which is still in business to this day. Jane and Michael Stern write that "Oklahoma is especially rich in classic coneys" and call out the Coney I-Lander, writing they "perfectly deliver the cheap-eats ecstasy that is the Coney's soul." Oklahoma coneys are small hot dogs on steamed buns with a spicy-sweet dark brown chili sauce, onions, and optional cheese and hot sauce.

=== Pennsylvania ===
Restaurants offering Coneys opened across Pennsylvania in the 1910s and 1920s, among them The Coney Island in Pottsville in 1917, Coney Island Lunch in Shamokin in 1918, and Coney Island Texas Wieners in Scranton in 1923. A 2005 Pennsylvania heritage study of Schuylkill County, in the anthracite Coal Region, observed that Greek immigrants settling in the area generally ran hot dog counters rather than restaurants serving their native cuisine.

=== Texas ===
James Coney Island operates a number of locations in the area of Houston, Texas. The company was founded in 1923 by two Greek immigrant brothers, James and Tom Papadakis, the former being the company's namesake.

== See also ==
- Coney Island, a type of diner
- Chili dog, a very similar dish
- Michigan hot dog, a related dish popular in upstate New York
- New York System wiener, a similar dish sharing Greek-immigrant roots

== Lists ==
- Cuisine of the Midwestern United States
- List of hot dogs
- List of regional dishes of the United States
