= North Shore Shrimp Trucks =

Shrimp trucks on the North Shore of Oahu, Hawaii

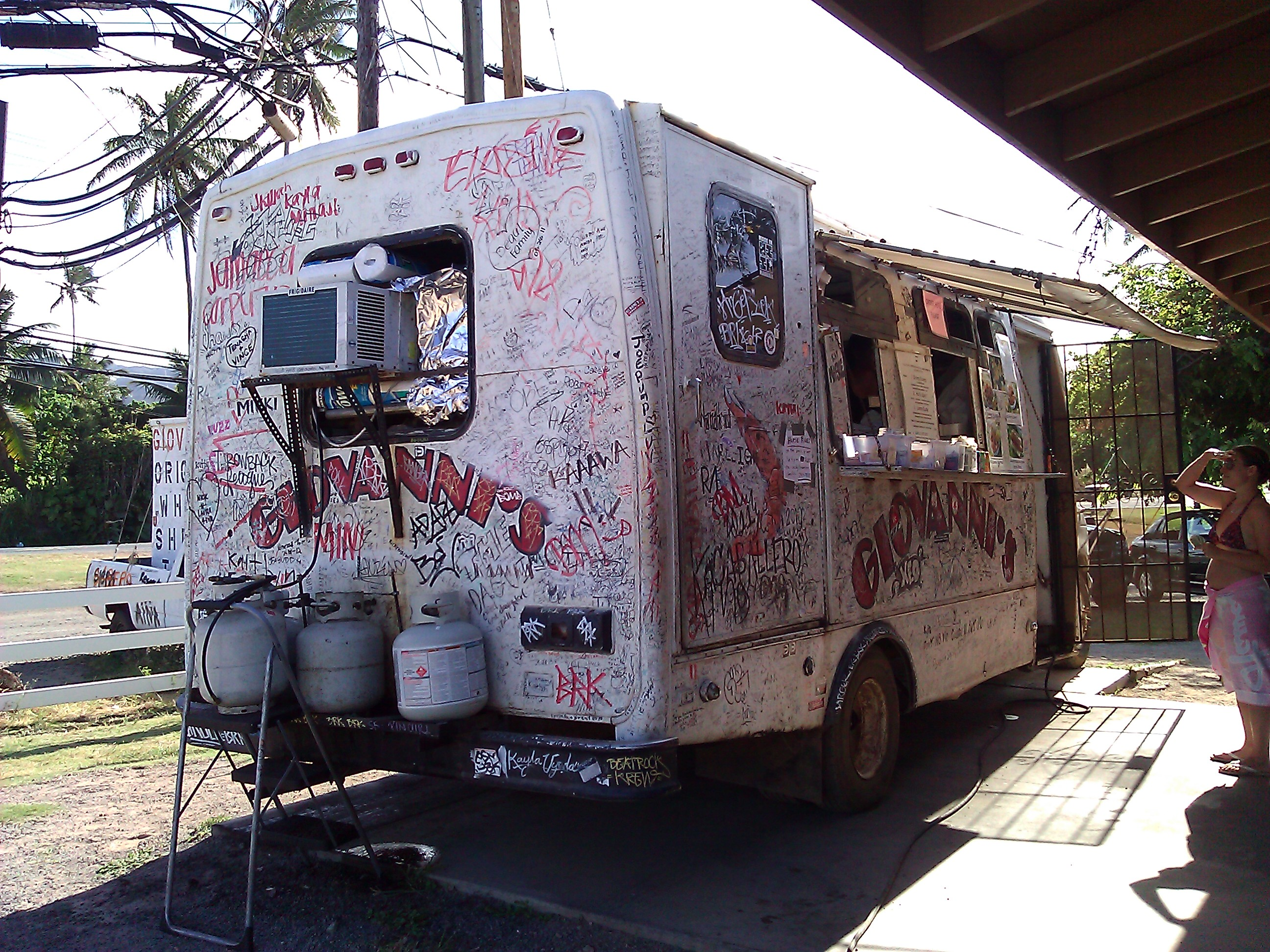
Giovanni's Shrimp Truck

North Shore Shrimp Trucks is a common term on the island of Oahu in Hawaii for a group of individually owned and operated trucks and establishments that sell mostly local, fresh shrimp along the island's North Shore, mostly near the town of Kahuku. Other trucks can be found along Kamehameha Highway from Haleiwa Town to Punaluu and at Kualoa Ranch in Kaaawa.

== History ==
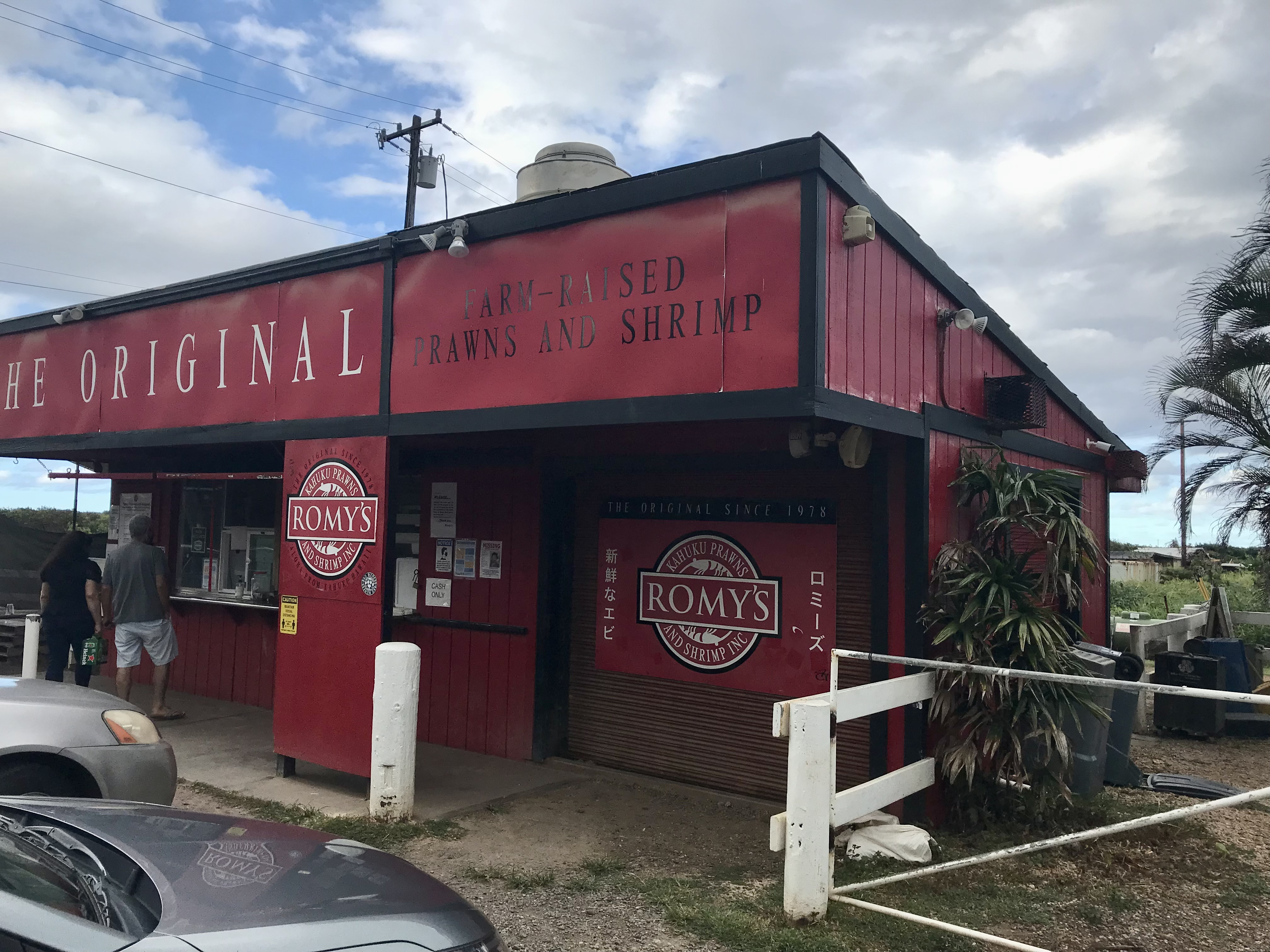
Romy's Shrimp in Kahuku

The North Shore became an important center for large scale fresh water aquaculture after the state began research and promotion efforts in 1975. In 1993, Giovanni's (now Giovanni's Original White Shrimp Truck) started serving shrimp from a mobile truck, which set up a permanent location in Kahuku by 1995.

Some of the shrimp trucks that have operated along the North Shore include: Big Wave Shrimp, Blue Water Shrimp, Famous Kahuku Shrimp Truck, Fumi's Kahuku Shrimp and Seafood, Giovanni's Original White Shrimp Truck, Macky's Kahuku Sweet Shrimp, Romy's Kahuku Prawns and Shrimp Hut, and The Shrimp Shack.

Each truck has a unique style and flavor but most serve both the garlic butter and the hot and spicy shrimp along with their individual specialties. The servings are typically done Hawaiian plate lunch style, served with rice and/or macaroni salad.

== In the media ==
The Travel Channel show, Man v. Food Nation, featured Giovanni's Aloha Shrimp Truck in an episode set in Oahu.

== Gallery ==
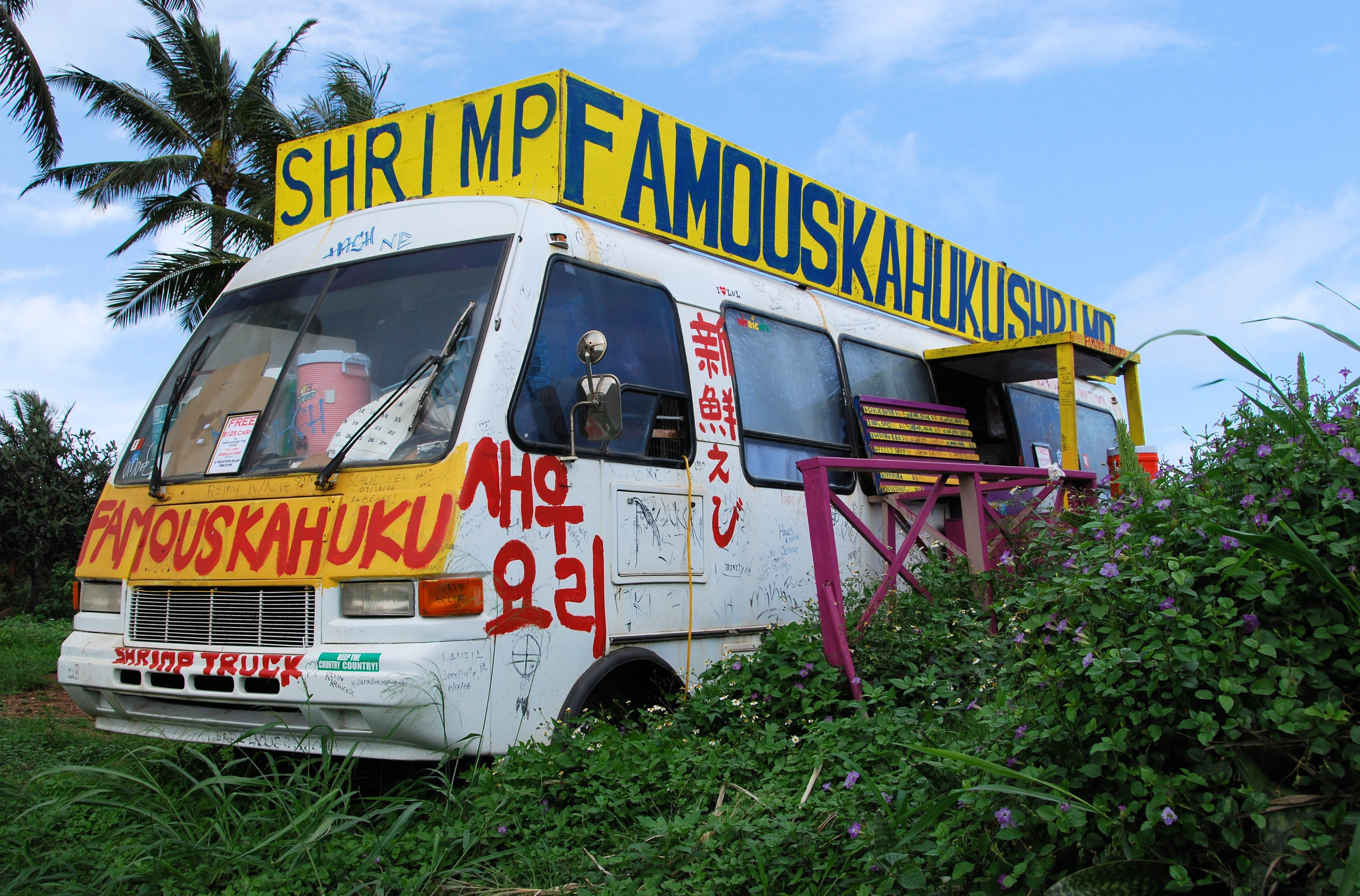
"Famous Kahuku Shrimp" truck

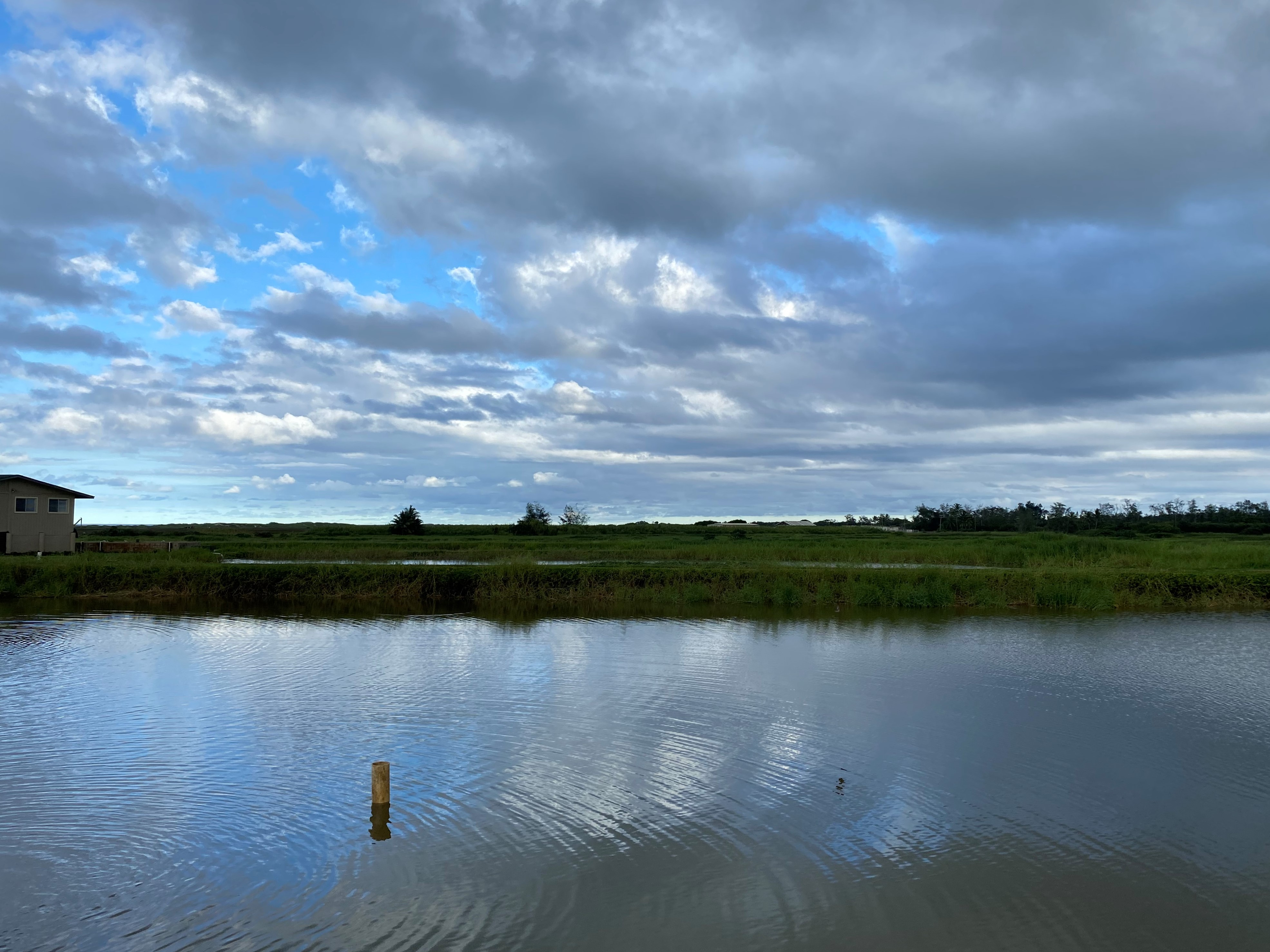
Shrimp farm behind Romy's in Kahuku
