= Man v. Food Nation =

- No. of episodes: 27

Release
- Original network: Travel Channel
- Original release: June 1, 2011 – April 11, 2012

Season chronology
- ← Previous; Season 3 Next → Season 5

Man v. Food Nation is the name given to the fourth season of the Travel Channel's Man v. Food, a food reality television series. It premiered on June 1, 2011. A preview episode, "The Quest Begins", aired on May 25.

In this show, host Adam Richman travels to cities around the U.S. to try the signature food dishes of their local eateries. Unlike the previous three seasons of Man v. Food, where he himself took on a food challenge at a local restaurant, in this season, Richman recruits residents of the city he visits to take on a food challenge, while he serves as their coach by giving them tips and advice on how to beat their challenges, using the skills he learned previously from his own food challenges.

The final tally for the season was 11 wins for Man and 16 wins for Food. This was the first and only season to start (and end) with Food winning the challenge. It is also the only season in which Food scored more victories than Man.

With Richman announcing his retirement from competitive eating on January 27, 2012, Man v. Food Nation would be his final season of Man v. Food. On April 11 (after a four-month hiatus), episodes filmed in Charlotte, North Carolina, and Jackson, Mississippi, were aired, marking what was then the official close of the series.

In May 2017, Travel Channel announced a revival of the series, with Casey Webb replacing Richman as host. The fifth season (and Webb's first) premiered on August 7 the same year.

== Episodes ==
| Episode | Episode Number | Original Air Date | Winner | Challenge |
| New Haven, CT | 1 (59) | June 1, 2011 | Food | Caseus Cheese Truck |
|---|---|---|---|---|
For the first episode of Man v. Food Nation, Adam visited New Haven, Connecticut, home to the prestigious Yale University (where he earned his master's degree from Yale's School of Drama). The first stop on his trip was Louis' Lunch, inventor of the original American hamburger. At Louis' Lunch, opened in 1895, the quarter pound hamburgers are cooked on the original vertical flame grill and served on white toast with your only choice of toppings cheddar cheese spread, tomato and onions. The restaurant, perhaps notoriously, refuses to serve any ketchup. They also serve only potato salad, no fries. Adam tried a "Cheese Works" burger, which had all the available toppings. The patties were topped with an onion slice and cooked in the vertical flame grill. Then, Adam stopped at Modern Apizza where they bake their pizzas in a brick oven at 825 degrees F. Adam visited to try a clams casino pie, a white pie featuring toppings such as Rhode Island clams, Mozzarella cheese, roasted peppers and crispy bacon. The dough is kneaded to a thin, 20-inch diameter and grande mozzarella cheese spread on top. The clams are then added, followed by red and green roasted peppers, thick cut bacon, garlic, oregano and pecorino romano cheese. Baked for just four minutes, this apizza with super thin crust highly impressed Adam. For the challenge, Adam recruited Yale student Ric Best, AKA "King Hungry VIII", to take on the Caseus Cheese Truck Challenge. The challenge requires you to eat 10 grilled cheese sandwiches (made with provolone, swiss, comté, gouda, gruyère, muenster, and extra sharp cheddar cheeses on fresh-grilled sourdough bread, all with at least one topping of his choice and weighing a total of 6 pounds). Downing all 10 sandwiches within an hour would allow him to name his very own sandwich for the menu and also win free grilled cheese sandwiches for one year. Only one person had been able to defeat this challenge prior to this episode's taping. Adam gave Ric some valuable advice, such as stacking two sandwiches on top of each other and doing "all his damage in the first 23 minutes". For the challenge, Ric chose grilled red onions as his topping. He downed the first two sandwiches in the first 5 minutes of the challenge, and then finished the fifth sandwich at the 15-minute mark. He then combined sandwiches 6-8 into one triple sandwich and went at it furiously. But, about halfway through it, he hit the food wall. Adam then handed Ric a beverage (upon Adam's recommendation) to help him swallow the food more easily. Though he managed to finish the triple sandwich at about 24 minutes in, Ric did not feel like he could continue, and ultimately declared Food the winner. This was Ric's second attempt to beat this challenge (in the first, he had eaten only 5 sandwiches, so his second attempt broke his previous personal best). Adam gave him a Man v. Food Nation title belt for his effort.
| Tampa, FL | 2 (60) | June 1, 2011 | Man | Davy Jones |
This episode showcased the "big food" of restaurants in Tampa. Adam first visited Skippers Smokehouse, where they feature Florida decor and seafood dishes ranging from smoked shark to a blackened grouper reuben sandwich. Opened in 1980, Skippers has a unique outdoor kitchen and offers alligator chili and ribs. The gator ribs are basted in "goo", a mixture of barbecue sauce, spice rub, olive oil and key lime juice and smoked in a one of a kind pressure smoker with hickory wood chips for two hours. He compared their taste to pork ribs. He then spent time watching professional wrestling tag team The Nasty Boys in training before trying a Cubano sandwich at Aguila's Sandwich Shop. Located close to nearby Ybor City, Aguila's has been in business since 1986. They make their Cuban sandwiches the traditional way, with boiled ham, roast pork, pickles, mustard and Swiss cheese. The pork has been cooked for four hours, hand pulled and marinated in mojo sauce, a blend of citrus, garlic and sour onion. After the meat and toppings are loaded on a loaf of authentic Cuban bread, the sandwich is pressed on a plancha. This was all before Adam visited Rapscallions in Land o' Lakes and recruited Nasty Boys member Jerry Sags (a self-professed spicy food fan and habanero grower) to take on the Davy Jones Challenge. The challenge consists of eating 10 chicken wings doused in a sauce composed of roasted garlic and habaneros, chile de árbol, hot sauce, orange juice, red wine vinegar blended together. Spicy capsaicin extract known as "the Blood of Davy Jones" is then added along with a cup of red pepper flakes and cayenne pepper. The wings were to be completed in 30 minutes or less, with a 5-minute afterburn period. Sags' wrestling partner Brian Knobs would be among the spectators. Out of hundreds that had attempted this challenge prior to Sags, only nine challengers were successful. Adam advised Sags to keep his hands clean and "go to his happy place" to survive the intense heat. Adam also advised Sags to strip the meat off the bone to reduce the chances of the intensely hot sauce touching his lips. Taking Adam's advice, Sags was able to eat all the meat from the wings in only 6 minutes, but clearly suffered through the pain of the afterburn. Ultimately though, he managed to survive the afterburn period and became the 10th winner of the challenge. He received a t-shirt, a picture on the "Wall of Pain" and a Man v. Food Nation title belt. Post-episode update: According to the food blog Dan vs. Food, Rapscallions permanently closed in July 2012.
| Nashville, TN | 3 (61) | June 8, 2011 | Food | Big Roost |
Adam sampled the best food Nashville had to offer. His first stop was Prince's Hot Chicken Shack to try their signature fried hot chicken. Opened in 1941, Prince's soaks in its top secret marinade and then is coated in flour mixed with spices (notably cayenne, while most of the other spices are kept secret). It is then deep fried for 20 minutes and doused in the spicy sauce, topped with pickles and then sprinkled with more spices before being placed on a slice of white bread. While finding it spicier than he anticipated, Adam decided to pour some honey on the chicken, a move that the restaurant's owner said she never saw before. This segment also featured a special guest appearance by former Nashville mayor Bill Purcell. After introducing the viewers to this episode's challengers, Nashville-based country duo the LoCash Cowboys (Chris Lucas and Preston Brust), and paying a visit to the Grand Ole Opry, Adam ventured to the Pancake Pantry where they serve 23 different varieties from the banana and coconut Caribbean Cakes to the Swiss Chocolate Chip to the Georgia Peach. Adam tried their "Village Smithy" pancakes, crispy cornmeal pancakes filled with cheddar cheese, bacon, and green chiles while topped with salsa, sour cream, butter, and maple syrup. He also learned to not pat these pancakes as they were being prepared. Eggs, oil and milk are mixed with cornmeal instead of flour, giving it a unique texture. The cheese, bacon and chiles are added before flipping. After a second visit with the LoCash Cowboys (and a song they wrote, which they dedicated to their challenge), Adam went to Rooster's Texas Style BBQ and Steakhouse to guide the pair through the Big Roost Challenge: a platter featuring a 72-ounce sirloin steak, a baked potato, a salad, and 2 slices of Texas toast. The four inch thick sirloin is butterflied and sprinkled with their secret spice rub. It is then seared on both sides before being placed on the hickory smoke grill. Beer is poured over the steak as it is grilled for 15 minutes on each side. The duo, each of whom had their own platter to deal with, had one hour to finish the entire challenge, which prior to this episode had been undefeated. Adam's advice for the challenge was to break up the taste of steak with the salad, the potato, and even a glass of red wine. The duo started off strong by consuming nearly a third of their steaks in about 10 minutes. However, at the 30-minute mark, they started to get "food drunk" and began to slow down with the challenge until the arrival of country music superstar Vince Gill inspired them to keep eating. Ultimately, time ran out on their challenge after each valiantly consumed about three-quarters of their steaks and half of their sides, and the challenge remained undefeated. Post-episode update: Rooster's Texas Style BBQ and Steakhouse shut down in May 2013.
| Tulsa, OK | 4 (62) | June 15, 2011 | Man | Incinerator Pizza |
Adam visited Tulsa, once the oil capital of the world, for their best eateries. His first stop took him to the Spudder, a restaurant loaded with petroleum signs and other oil-related decor (as a throwback to Tulsa's oil history), where he tried the "Gusher", a 22-ounce charbroiled bone-in prime rib. Founded in 1976, Spudder lightly sprinkles their prime rib with salt and cooks it in its one of a kind stainless steel charbroiler where it is cooked for eight minutes on each side. Next, he checked out the "Center of the Universe" to test his echo before going to Bill's Jumbo Burgers where the Henry family has manned the counter since 1960. Bill's offers seven kinds of burgers from the 1/3-pound "Big Daddy" to the 1 1/2-pound "T Town." Adam was there for the "Double Okie", a 4-patty, 2-pound burger. In true Oklahoma fashion, chopped onions are pressed into the freshly made burger patties before frying so that more flavor is cooked into the meat. Six slices of cheese are placed on the burger patties which are then stacked on a bun with lettuce, tomato, ketchup and mustard. After that, he recruited Tulsa firefighter Kyle Younger to take on the Incinerator Challenge at Joe Momma's. Pizza dough is topped with marinara sauce and then a jalapeño and habanero relish. Mozzarella cheese is then followed by pepperoni, hot link sausage, salami and ham. Sliced jalapeños and chopped habaneros before it is placed in the pizza oven. After baking, swirls of wasabi sauce and "Death Sauce" (a mixture of sriracha and ghost chilis) finish off the pizza. Kyle had to eat this entire 10-slice pizza in an hour, with no drinks to relieve the heat. Prior to this episode, just 3 people out of hundreds had ever beaten this challenge. Before the challenge, Adam gave Kyle advice such as eating as much of the pizza as possible before the heat kicks in, paying attention to the ghost chili, and cutting the crusts off and leaving them for later when necessary. Adam also decided to try a slice himself before Kyle took on the challenge and quickly regretted doing so. During the challenge, Kyle started strong by eating half the pizza in 20 minutes before the pain of the peppers set in. With about one slice left, he almost threw up (which would have ended the challenge). His chief then came by to give him support. The inspiration helped him pull it together and finish the whole pizza. Left with only a handful of the peppers, he quickly managed to polish them off. For his victory, Kyle became the 4th person to beat the challenge and won a t-shirt, his picture on the Wall of Fame, and his own Man v. Food Nation title belt. Post-episode update: Joe Momma's announced on its Facebook page that it would permanently close December 8, 2018.
| Albuquerque, NM | 5 (63) | June 22, 2011 | Food | Travis on a Silver Platter |
Adam started off his trip to Albuquerque with a visit to Frontier Restaurant (across from the campus of the University of New Mexico), which serves nearly everything on its menu with roasted green chilis, a New Mexico staple vegetable. Adam tried the "Bonanza Burger", which features two quarter-pound patties topped with shredded cheese, bacon and cooked green chilis, with a side of homemade onion rings. Frontier grills the green chili in a roaster behind the restaurant. Next, Adam ventured to Sadie's where they are known for their sopaipillas. The fry bread is traditionally served with honey, sugar and cinnamon. However, there are also savory sopaipillas. They serve a 6.5-pound version appropriately called the "World's Biggest Stuffed Sopaipilla". A foot-wide circle of dough is deep fried in 425 degree oil. It is then filled with three heaping ladles of refried pinto beans and fried potatoes and servings of stewed chicken, ground beef, carne adobada. A sauce of both red and green chiles (together known as "Christmas") is poured over the top, then topped with multiple layers of shredded cheddar cheese and more chile sauce. The final stop, Grandma's K & I Diner, was the setting for the "Travis on a Silver Platter Challenge". The 6-pound beef-and-bean burrito is buried in 2 pounds of fries, making this challenge weigh in at 8 pounds. Three flour tortillas are loaded with beef and beans is covered in a sausage-infused red chili sauce and shredded cheddar cheese. After the burrito is rolled, green chili sauce is poured over the top and more shredded cheese is added along with shredded lettuce and diced tomatoes and onions. This challenge was defeated by just 2 people prior to this episode. Adam noted that this challenge may be the hardest shown in the show's history. To honor the challenge's name, Adam recruited three men named Travis: University of New Mexico student Travis Albreski (who had attempted this challenge before, albeit unsuccessfully), local weatherman Travis Christy, and professional bull rider Travis Briscoe (who mentioned that his father once tried the challenge but also failed). Their objective was to finish the entire platter in an hour in order to make the restaurant's Wall of Fame. On hand in the crowd to cheer on the challengers were the University of New Mexico cheerleaders and the university's mascot, Louie the Lobo. Albreski strategized by ordering green chili to eat with his burrito, and the others followed suit. Soon, they all hit the food wall and Christy surrendered. Albreski and Briscoe continued, but neither could finish their portions in the allotted time. Briscoe ultimately downed three pounds of his challenge, while Albreski ate 4.5 pounds (a personal best). All three Travises were still given Man v. Food Nation title belts for their efforts.
| Mobile, AL | 6 (64) | June 29, 2011 | Food | Wintzell Oyster Contest |
Adam visited Mobile, Alabama for the best of their local eateries. For his first stop, Adam went to The Hungry Owl who are known for the creole creations from smoked gouda grits to alligator pot pie. However, Adam was there to try their signature "Tony Burger", a one-pound angus burger stuffed and topped with 20 ingredients. You start by sautéing the "Trinity" (a mixture of onions, peppers and celery) and mixing in slices of Conecuh pork sausage. The mixture is then sprinkled with the restaurant's secret spice blend called "Owl Dust" that contains thyme and oregano among other spices. The vegetable and meat mixture is then stuffed between two angus patties along with slices of cheddar, swiss and pepper jack cheeses. As it is placed on the grill, it is doused with worcestershire sauce and more Owl Dust. After basting the burger with creole barbeque sauce, layers of bacon, candied jalapeño peppers, gouda and sharp cheddar cheese are added. The burger is then placed on a bun with lettuce and tomato before being topped off with a fried egg. Next, he visited The Brick Pit to experience their succulent take on pulled pork. Unlike most pork which is smoked for 8–16 hours, The Brick Pit smokes theirs for a full 30 hours. The restaurant's smoker is custom built to smoked up to 550 pounds of meat daily. The Brick Pit also does not have a stove or oven and cooks everythings including their beans and sauce in the smoker. Nine-pound pork butts are loaded into the smoker without any extra seasoning. After smoking, it is pulled into strips and covered with spicy barbeque sauce. This episode's challenge took place at Wintzell's Oyster House & Restaurant; there, Adam recruited software support representative Joseph "Big Joe" Evans for Wintzell's Oyster House Challenge. Big Joe was a previous champion of this challenge when he ate 406 Alabama oysters in under an hour in July 2003. But, then his record was broken in September 2010 when another challenger (named Ken) ate 421. To reclaim his title as champion, Big Joe had to eat 422 oysters within the time limit. Prior to the challenge, Adam shared tips with Big Joe such as pacing himself, adding in condiments, and eating crackers to change the consistency of what he's eating. Big Joe started the challenge very strong by eating 100 oysters in just three minutes and then finishing his 200th oyster at about 10 minutes in. At about 15 minutes in though, he started to struggle with the oysters' texture. So, he strategized by squirting them with lemon and ordering a pack of crackers to change up the texture. Despite this, however, he slowed down and could not recover. He ultimately ran out of time after consuming 305 oysters. Post-episode update: According to multiple reviewers on Yelp, Reddit and Foursquare, The Hungry Owl permanently closed in June 2016. Post-episode update: The Brick Pit was closed by the original owner in January 2018. After a brief revival in 2019 by new owners, it was eventually closed permanently.
| Florida Keys | 7 (65) | July 6, 2011 | Food | Fritter Eating Contest |
Adam headed to the Florida Keys, home of breathtaking beaches and, as always, delicious food for him to partake in. His first stop took him to the Hogfish Bar & Grill in Stock Island to eat their "Killer Hogfish" sandwich. The locals enjoy the Hogfish for its clean, scallop-like flavor. The only way to catch the fish is to spear it. Fishermen spear the fish daily and bring it to the restaurant. Opened since 2002, the Hogfish Bar & Grill offerz the fish in tacos, on salads and over eggs. Their signature sandwich features a fried, crispy half-pound hogfish fillet served with melted Swiss cheese and sauteed mushrooms and onions on grilled Cuban bread. Salt and pepper are sprinkled on two hogfish fillets, which are then dipped in flour, buttermilk and panko before being deep fried. The mushrooms and onion are cooked before the cheese is melted over them. The Cuban bread is then grilled before everything is stacked on along with lettuce, tomato and pickles. The second stop was Key West establishment Blue Heaven, home to authentic key lime pie, topped with meringue. Before enjoying his own helping of the pie, Adam sat down with rapper Vanilla Ice, who emphasized his enjoyment of the freshness of the key limes. To make the pie, juice from freshly picked key limes is combined with egg yolks and condensed milk. The mixture is used to fill up a homemade graham cracker pie crust. The meringue is made by whisking egg white and sugar until firm. The pie is then baked for 25 minutes. For the challenge segment, filmed on May 1, Adam headed to Key Largo Conch House for the Conch Republic Fritter Challenge, where 10 contestants go head-to-head in a competition to see who can eat the most deep-fried Conch Fritters in 15 minutes. Adam's recruit for the contest was University of Miami student and sorority member Cassie Glenn, who was considered an underdog due to her diminutive size (standing just 5 feet tall). Adam's advice for Cassie was to keep moving, stay hydrated, and maintain a steady pace. The conch is made up of tough muscle, so it is first tenderized. The conch is the cut up in a food processor with fresh vegetables. Spices, including cayenne pepper and curry powder are then mixed in along with beer. An ice cream scooper is used to make one ounce fritters which are deep fried for three minutes. In the competition (which was emceed by Adam himself), Cassie started strong by eating 6 fritters in the first minute, and heeded Adam's advice by drinking water to stay hydrated (even dunking some of the fritters in the water). She kept moving as Adam advised and stayed among the top of the competition for the most part, but with about 5 minutes to go, Cassie hit the food wall (due to not pacing herself and instead going fast) and only managed one more fritter before time expired. When all was said and done, she ate a grand total of 26 fritters, which was not enough to beat the winning contestant, Mack Fowler, who downed 42 fritters (a new contest record; the previous record was 25, which Cassie also beat). Upon giving her her own Man v. Food Nation title belt, Adam emphasized how impressed he was with Cassie's effort; though he declared Man the winner of the battle, it is technically a win for Food (due to Cassie not finishing in first place).
| Gulf Coast | 8 (66) | July 13, 2011 | Food | Muffaletta |
Adam's southern exposure continued as he sampled the tastiest foods throughout the Gulf Coast. His first stop was The Shed Barbeque and Blues Joint, located in Ocean Springs, Mississippi. Opened in 2002, they are known across the region for their pork-centric menu. The owner even smokes who hogs inside an old Jeep-turned-smoker for 20 hours. Adam sampled different parts of the pig, cut directly from a freshly smoked whole hog, from the shoulder to the cheek to the belly. After sampling parts of the whole hog, Adam turned to sampling the restaurant's famous baby back ribs. The Shed seasons their ribs a day in advance with a sweet and savory rub. After smoking for 90 minutes, they are removed and scored with a knife. More rub is added and they are drizzled in barbeque sauce and wrapped in foil before smoking for two more hours. Next, Adam visited the Original Oyster House in Gulf Shores, Alabama for a helping of fresh seafood. Located on the bayou just off the Gulf of Mexico, Original Oyster House serves up locally caught seafood, including 5,900 pounds of oysters every week. The restaurant allows patrons to customize their own platters. He customized his "Man v. Food Nation" platter with fried oysters, fried crawfish tails, shrimp scampi, stuffed crab, and seared Bourbon-glazed yellow finahi tuna. The oysters are battered in seasoned flour, milk wash and cracker meal before being deep fried for three minutes The crawfish tails receive the same treatment. Scampi buttered is poured over shrimp and baked stuffed blue crab and tops each with paprika. For this episode's challenge, Adam ventured to Calypso Beach Café in Panama City Beach, Florida, where he recruited rock vocalist and former Blue Angels crew chief A.J. Fratto for the Muffaletta Challenge. a 6-pound sandwich The challenge features ham, Cotto salami, Genoa salami, melted mozzarella and provolone cheeses, and olive salad on a -9inch Sicilian roll and weighs six pounds. It is also served with a half-pound side of rice and beans topped with an andouille sausage. The dense bun is coated in seasoned oil before stacking nearly a pound each of ham, peppercorn seasoned Cotto salami and genoa salami. Half a pound each of mozzarella and provolone cheese follows before the bun it toasted and the meat and cheese cooked in the oven. After it is removed, the olive salad is spread on the bun, followed by a layer of meat and cheese, another layer of olive salad and a final layer of meat and cheese. A.J. had an hour to take down this challenge, which was undefeated prior to this episode's taping. Adam advised A.J. to incorporate the sides into the sandwich so that they wouldn't get cold later on. A.J. took down the first quarter in 13 minutes but began to struggle as he started the second quarter. He struggled mightily enough that he still had half the sandwich remaining with only 5 minutes left, so Adam decided to eat some of the sandwich with him; despite their efforts, time ran out on A.J. after eating 3 pounds of the sandwich, which, to that point, was the most anyone had ever taken down, as the challenge remained undefeated. Post-episode update: According to The Shed's Twitter account, the restaurant burned down on February 12, 2012. However, it was quickly rebuilt and opened again shortly thereafter. Post-episode update: According to multiple reviewers on Yelp, the Calypso Beach Café permanently closed in June 2016.
| Portsmouth, NH | 9 (67) | July 20, 2011 | Man | Slapshot |
Adam headed to Portsmouth, New Hampshire. The first stop took him to Gilley's Diner where they are known in the area for their franks and burgers. Gilley's steams their hot dogs and serves them on a New England style roll. The original Gilley's hot dog had just three toppings, mustard, chopped onions and relish. But, Adam tried a chili dog with "the Works" - a beef, pork and veal frank smothered in chili con carne, relish, chopped onions, sauerkraut, ketchup and mustard - and a side of poutine, fries topped with fresh cheese curds and gravy. Next, Adam stopped by the Friendly Toast, which serves one-of-a-kind breakfast creations like cayenne cheddar toast topped with chipotle, sweet potatoes, eggs and mango sour cream to gingerbread waffles smothered in pomegranate molasses and whipped cream. But, Adam visited to try the "Sklarmageddon", a 6-egg omelet mixed with three meats, Swiss and Jalapeño Jack cheeses, and red chili pecans, all topped with maple sour cream. A mix of bacon, sausage and Virginia baked ham is browned on the grill. The mixture of meats is added to six eggs, followed by pecans that have been marinated in spices for a week. Swiss and jalapeño jack cheese are layered on before the omelet pan is put into the broiler. The maple sour cream is drizzled over the finished omelet, which is then served with sides of cayenne hash browns and six-pepper Parmesan toast. This episode's challenge took place at JP's Eatery in Durham on June 5; there, Adam recruited University of New Hampshire strength coach Paul "Chappy" Chapman for the Slapshot Challenge: a plate of 15 hamburger sliders, plus a half-pound of fries and a 14-ounce milkshake (at Chappy's request, vanilla), all of which must be completed within 30 minutes. Out of more than 200 previous challengers prior to Chappy, over 90% of them have failed this challenge. Adam's advice for Chappy was to use condiments on the sliders, combine the fries with the sliders, and use the milkshake to wash down the food. 15 one ounce buns are buttered and toasted on the grill. The slider patties are seasoned with salted and pepper and served with no toppings. Chappy ate the first few sliders on their own before taking Adam's advice to incorporate the fries and some condiments (such as mustard, ketchup, and at his request, mayonnaise). He also sipped the milkshake for every few bites. He ran into trouble late in the challenge, but fought on and managed to finish it off with just 4 seconds to spare. Chappy received a t-shirt for his efforts, as well as his own Man v. Food Nation title belt. NOTE: This is the first mass-quantity challenge that Man won this season. The previous two wins for Man were both against spicy challenges.
| Louisville, KY | 10 (68) | July 27, 2011 | Food | Comfy Cow |
Adam visited Louisville, home to the heralded Kentucky Derby horse race. First, Adam paid a visit to the Brown Hotel, where he tried their famed "Hot Brown", an open-faced sandwich of roasted turkey, bacon, Mornay sauce and Pecorino Romano cheese served over Texas toast. The Brown Hotel invented the dish in 1926. One slice of Texas is cut into a square, while another is cut into two triangles. Turkey breast is broken up by hand and placed on the square slice. Two beefsteak tomatoes are added and the dish is loaded into the oven. The mornay sauce starts with butter, flower and cream. Pecroino cheese is then mixed in and then the sauce is ladled over the hot turkey and toast. Two slices of bacon are put on top and more cheese is sprinkled on. The finished dish is then put into a broiler called a salamander. Adam's second stop was Lynn's Paradise Cafe. Opened in 1991, Lynn's features a decor that is an ever evolving work of art, full of tea bag sculptures, interior landscaping and customized seating. It offers inspired fare like the Fried Green Tomato B.L.T, the Wild Mushroom Scramble and the Popeye Omelet. However, Adam was there to try the Quadruple "B" French Toast, buttermilk and black walnut bread, topped with blackberry sauce and bourbon meringue. The homemade bread contains buttermilk and black walnut, slices of which are dunked in a signature egg wash. It is then grilled (here, Adam experienced the restaurant's unique grilling method - by launching the toast onto the outdoor griddle with a 19th-Century catapult) and topped with a blackberry glaze (freshly blended blackberries that are strained to remove the seeds) and Bourbon meringue. The bourbon merinque is then browned with a blow torch. For the challenge, Adam went to ice cream establishment the Comfy Cow, where he would recruit warehouse custodian Joseph "Burrito Joe" Nikolai for the namesake Comfy Cow Challenge: 15 scoops of ice cream topped with a pound each of fruit toppings and whipped cream, and a quarter-pound of nuts. Altogether, this sundae weighed a massive 7 1/2 pounds, and Joe had an hour to finish it all. Adam's tips for Joe were eat fast, eat something salty when the sweetness gets to be too much, and drink water. Since 2009, the Comfy Cow has offered a wide variety of handcrafted premium ice creams and a variety of sweet sundaes. While the sundae was being prepared, Adam expressed concern over the fact that Joe decided to go with just one flavor of ice cream (specifically, vanilla) rather than pick more than one flavor to mix things up. The 15 scoops of ice cream equals 5 1/2 pounds. Joe started the challenge off very well, eating the first pound in just 5 minutes, then half the challenge at the 10-minute mark, all while strategically mixing in the fruit and nut toppings for more flavor. At 20 minutes in, he had finished 7 pounds of the sundae. But, unfortunately, his fast pace proved to be a huge mistake as he threw it all up, instantly ending the challenge in favor of Food. After giving him a Man v. Food Nation title belt, Adam mentioned that, although Joe should have gone slower, he was very impressed by how fast he ate the sundae, saying that he had never seen anyone do it so fast. Post-episode update: Lynn's Paradise Cafe closed unexpectedly on January 12, 2013. This came several days after the restaurant established policies for its waitstaff that were potential violations of Kentucky law. Owner Lynn Winter said several months later that she closed the restaurant due to personal illness.
| Milwaukee, WI | 11 (69) | August 3, 2011 | Man | Unforgiven |
Adam visited Milwaukee, Wisconsin. His first stop took him to Martino's Restaurant, a family run eatery that opened in 1977. Though Martino's is known for having the best hot dogs in Milwaukee, Adam tried the "Italian Combo" - Italian sausage topped with Italian beef (dipped in Parmesan au jus), fresh giardiniera, and a homemade red sauce of pork and tomatoes. Mozzarella cheese is placed in a custom-baked loaf of Italian bread. The Italian sausage is added and covered in the Italian beef, roasted, sliced thin and soaked in the au jus. The meaty red sauce is poured over the sandwich and topped with giardiniera of pickled veggies and hot peppers. Next, Adam visited Benji's Deli where they have served traditional Jewish fare from classic matza ball soup to a multitude of cured meats. Benji's biggest creation packs all of their most popular meats into one sandwich, the "Hear O Israel." A quarter-pound each of pastrami, all beef salami, and pepper beef are sliced and placed on the grill to cook before steaming. Two slices of Swiss cheese is placed on the meat pile to melt. A quarter pound of sliced corn beef starts off the sandwich on rye bread. The pile of steamed meat and cheese is added before topping the sandwich with coleslaw and a slather of Thousand Island dressing. This episode's challenger, forklift operator Jeremy Wheeler, came in 14–0, undefeated against prior food challenges. The challenge took place at the Red Rock Saloon, where Jeremy had to take on the Unforgiven Challenge, which is the ultimate trifecta of size, speed and spice. It starts with a "Farm Burger." Two half pound beef patties are seasoned with a spice rub and placed on the grill where it is doused with a mix of worcestershire sauce and brisket glaze that is called "bug juice." Each patty is topped with a slice of cheddar cheese and three thick-cut strips of Applewood smoked bacon. The first patty is placed on a bun, followed by a half-pound fried chicken breast and the second burger patty. A fried egg and fried onion strings finish off the enormous sandwich. A pound of seasoned fries is added to the plate to bring the total weight of the plate to over three pounds. Finally, six "Takin' Care of Business" wings (chicken wings drenched in a sauce of jalapeños, Thai bird peppers, habaneros, and ghost chili) complete the challenge, which had to be finished in under a mere 23 minutes. This challenge had been defeated just once before Jeremy's attempt. Before the challenge started, Adam tried to tackle one wing and was rendered speechless for a moment. In the challenge, Jeremy was making good headway, alternating between the burger and wings (and working the fries into each bite of the burger). He almost finished the burger with seven minutes to spare when the heat of the wings suddenly caught up to him. With Adam's help, he finished the burger and fries with three minutes left, but still had three wings left. Fighting to the last second, Jeremy ultimately won the challenge when he finished the last wing with no time to spare (this was due to editing, Jeremy actually finished with about 20 seconds left). Jeremy became the second person to beat the challenge, got his picture on the Wall of Fame, the now-standard Man v. Food Nation title belt, and several other clothing items from the saloon. More importantly, perhaps, he remained undefeated in food challenges as his record now went to 15–0. Post-episode update: Martino's Restaurant permanently closed in December 2025.
| Providence, RI | 12 (70) | August 10, 2011 | Food | Hot Wiener |
Adam headed to Providence, Rhode Island. His first stop took him to Bob and Timmy's Grilled Pizza, where the pizzas are prepared over a charcoal grill and topped while still on the grill. Their offerings range from the red pepper layered chicken to the fully layered everything. Adam tried the spinach and mushroom pizza. Nine ounces of dough are soaked in olive oil and placed on the grill for two minutes before flipping it. Fresh garlic is sprinkled, followed by shredded Parmesan cheese. Leaf spinach covered the pie along with sauteed mushrooms. Tangy feta cheese is crumbled on before finishing it with a dusting of ground Parmesan. Next, Adam headed to the mobile Haven Brothers Diner to try out the "Triple Murder Burger." The diner is pulled by a diesel truck and typically parks in front of city hall. The 3-patty cheeseburger has toppings including bacon, mushrooms, onions, and a fried egg. Three three ounce patties are grilled, followed by the toppings. Adam requested that his egg yolk be left intact instead of broken as is normal. All three patties are topped with cheese. Then, bacon is placed on two patties, while the mushrooms, onions and fried egg top the third. Mayonnaise, mustard, relish, ketchup, lettuce and tomatoes are put on the bottom bun. This episode's challenge took place at the Olneyville New York System restaurant, where Rhode Island Rebellion rugby player Connor McQuade was to eat 15 hot dogs topped with mustard, meat sauce, and Spanish white onions in 45 minutes. The Hot Wiener Challenge had only been defeated by one person prior to Connor's attempt. His teammates promised that if he were to lose, he would have to get a purple unicorn tattoo. Adam's advice for Connor was to go easy on beverages, break up the flavor with condiments, and keep a steady pace. The hot dogs are custom made locally from a blend of beef, pork and veal and are cut fresh from 3-foot links. Each hot dog is grilled for four minutes. Mustard is added first, followed by the meat sauce (a mixture of onions, ground hamburger and a secret spice mix). It is topped with a layer of Spanish onions and a dash of celery salt. During the challenge, Connor started strong by eating the first 9 hot dogs in about 18 minutes, but soon hit the food wall. Adam advised Connor to get up and move around a bit before going on with the challenge; by that point, 6 hot dogs and 25 minutes remained. Connor ate as fast as he could, but struggled with the richness of the meat, and he ultimately ran out of time with 2.5 hot dogs to go. Still amazed by his effort, Adam gave Connor a Man v. Food Nation title belt. Post-episode update: Bob and Timmy's closed in the summer of 2016 before the original owner re-opened the restaurant, calling it Timmy's Legendary Pizza. Multiple Yelp reviewers posted that the second incarnation of the restaurant has permanently closed as well. The owners that bought the restaurant in 2007 reopened the concept in 2019 as a food truck in San Antonio called Bob and Timmy's Legendary Pizza on Wheels.
| Dallas, TX | 13 (71) | August 17, 2011 | Man | Super Phở |
Adam headed to Dallas. His first stop took him to Kuby's Sausage House for some authentic German sausages. Opened in 1961, Kuby's has an attached German market and offers a wide array of authentic German meat dishes from Jaeger Schmitzel to hot pastrami. They are known, however, for their German sausages and feature over 100 varieties of the meat. Adam tried a platter of those sausages featuring Nürnberger, Polish, Knackwurst, Grobe, and Weisswurst sausages, as well as the restaurant's jalapeño cheddar sausage. The sausages are boiled for 10 minutes before grilling them for char presentation. Later, he visited Sonny Bryan's Smokehouse for some authentic Texas-style barbeque. Sonny Bryan's is known for cooking their meat low and slow over an open pit. Their briskets are smoked for over nine hours over hickory wood. Adam tried their Brisket Sandwich that is topped with the restaurant's signature barbecue sauce and also enjoyed a side of onion rings. For the challenge, Adam visited Sprout's Springroll & Phở in Arlington, home to the Super Phở Challenge. Adam's recruit, financial analyst Pete "Food Avenger" MacGillis had 30 minutes to finish a 5-pound bowl of Vietnamese soup. The challenge starts with over two pounds of boiled noodles. Vietnamese meatballs, eye of round, and beef brisket are then added, before being topped with cilantro, and green and white onions. The restaurant's brisket-oxtail broth is then poured into the bowl . Pete started the challenge off very well, but a few minutes in was overwhelmed by the soup's heat. So, he poured in some of his ice water to cool it off. The strategy worked, and he went on to finish the entire soup in only 8 minutes and 12 seconds, which became the restaurant's new record time.
| Route 66 | 14 (72) | August 24, 2011 | Man | Puffy Taco |
Adam visited restaurants across the famous Midwestern road, U.S. Route 66. His first stop took him to Ted Drewes Frozen Custard in St. Louis, Missouri, where he tried the "Concrete" - frozen custard so thick that it won't fall out of the cup even when turned upside down. This dessert combines Ted Drewes vanilla custard with a selection of over 30 different toppings. Butterfat, honey, eggs and vanilla are combined in a continually flowing freezer that can make over 100 gallons a day. Three scoops of custard are combined in a cup with your choice of the toppings before being mixed. Adam customized his "Concrete" with oatmeal cookies, caramel, and macadamia nuts. Afterwards, he traveled to Idle Spurs Steakhouse in Barstow, California where they serve all cuts of beef from prime rib to top sirloin. Adam couldn't choose between the different cuts of beef, so he tried a 24-ounce porterhouse steak that combined a New York Strip and filet. The steaks are sprinkled with garlic salt and slathered with butter while being grilled. The challenge segment took place at Elote Café in Tulsa, Oklahoma, where Adam helped former U.S. Navy petty officer second class Manny Groll take on the Puffy Taco Challenge: he aimed to break the current puffy taco record by eating 23 of them in 90 minutes. Consuming that 7 pound platter would crown him the new "Puffy Taco Master". The puffy tacos consist of a fry bread-like shell topped with chicken, caramelized onions, romaine lettuce, shredded cheddar and Monterey Jack cheeses, and crema fresca. To help him win, Adam advised Manny to eat 15 tacos in the first 20 minutes, stay away from water if possible, and use salsa. Adam himself also tried the puffy tacos by eating two of them in one minute and 25 seconds, and realized how hard this challenge could be for Manny, noting that chewing through the taco shells was a bit of a strain. At the start of the challenge, Manny set a really fast pace by eating almost 15 tacos in the first 15 minutes. But soon they proved to be more difficult than he imagined, even after Adam handed him some avocado tomatillo sauce. In fact, he slowed down so much that by the time he had three left, only 10 minutes remained on the clock. However, wanting to make his son proud, Manny pushed himself to finish them off with three minutes left, and thus was crowned the new "Puffy Taco Master". In addition, Adam gave him his very own Man v. Food Nation title belt. Post-episode update: Idle Spurs Steakhouse permanently closed in January 2020. A representative for the owners said closing the restaurant was a possibility for quite some time and was done as a transition for owners and family to further manage their estate.
| Harlem, NY | 15 (73) | September 7, 2011 | Man | Squealer |
Adam returned to New York City, this time focusing exclusively on the best eats in the neighborhood of Harlem. His first stop was soul food restaurant Amy Ruth's. They have been serving up home-style southern cuisine such as baked mac and cheese and barbeque spareribs since 1988. They name all their dishes, even their daily specials, after a famous person. They are best known though for their fried chicken and waffles, known as the Rev. Al Sharpton. Secret seasoning is added by hand to the chicken which then marinates for 24 hours. Afterwards, it is coated in flour and deep fried. For a fluffier texture, the restaurant adds malt powder to their waffle mix. Next, Adam visited Puerto Rican establishment La Fonda Boricua in Spanish Harlem where they offer everything from rice and chicken to mofongo. Adam tried their biggest one that is called the "Mofongaso", which is made with 12 fried plantains and a Puerto Rican pork shoulder known as pernil. A 10-pound pork shoulder is stabbed with a knife to allow the spices to penetrate throughout the pernil. The pork shoulder is marinated for 24 hours and then roasted for another five hours. 12 plantains are cut up and deep fried. The shredded pernil and fried plantains are mashed up with oil, garlic and beef gravy with a giant mortar and pestle known as a pilon. The mixture is molded onto a plate and garnished with more pernil and topped with a pepper and onion sauce known as escabeche. This episode's challenge took place at Rack & Soul, a barbecue restaurant which features the Squealer Challenge: a pulled pork po' boy sandwich topped with coleslaw and an extremely spicy honey-barbecue sauce. A pork butt that has smoked for four hours is shredded and two pounds is added to a bun. After topping the pork with cole slaw, the restaurant's Squealer Sauce is poured on top. The Squealer Sauce is made by adding drops of pure capsaicin extract to the restaurant's sweet barbeque sauce. Adam coached three of the famed Harlem Globetrotters - William "Bull" Bullard, Donte "Hammer" Harrison, and "Slick" Willie Shaw - through this challenge, giving them advice such as "powering through to beat the heat". The trio had 15 minutes to finish their entire sandwiches, and then had to endure a 5-minute afterburn. Also, they were competing as a team; if one of them were to fail to finish his sandwich, then the entire team would lose the challenge. At the start of the challenge, all three of them were immediately overwhelmed by the heat of the sauce after their first bite. After a few minutes, they resumed eating, and with less than two minutes to spare, Slick and Hammer finished their sandwiches, but Bull struggled. Adam advised him to gather the remnants of the sandwich into one handful and scoop it into his mouth, and Bull did just that with no time to spare. Afterwards, though, the team still had to go through the afterburn. Though it looked for a moment like they would not endure, they managed to survive the five minutes, winning the challenge. After Adam gave them their customary Man v. Food Nation title belts, the trio presented him with his own Harlem Globetrotters jersey (complete with Adam's name on the back), very much to his joyful surprise. Post-episode update: Rack & Soul closed without explanation from the owner in January 2012. Post-episode update: According to its company website, La Fonda Baricua went through ownership and name changes and is now known as La Fonda NYC.
| Pacific Coast Highway | 16 (74) | September 14, 2011 | Man | Brahma Bull |
In this episode, Adam took a drive up California's beautiful Pacific Coast Highway for its best eats. His first stop landed him at the Reel Inn in Malibu for some fresh seafood. The fresh seafood, which is caught just hours before, has been featured since 1986. You can get your fish grilled, sauteed or coated in cajun seasoning. Adam tried sauteed Pacific halibut which is first dusted in cracker meal and then prepared in a saute pan fox six minutes with a sauce of butter, tomatoes, capers and white wine. This segment featured a special guest appearance by actor Chad Michael Murray. After enjoying his halibut, Adam's next stop was La Super-Rica Taquería in Santa Barbara, which features the Mexico City style taco, an open-faced handmade corn tortilla topped with meat. While La Super-Rica serves gorditas to bowls of chorizo with melted cheese, Adam tried the "La Super-Rica Especial" - three corn tortillas topped with diced marinated pork and a chopped up Monterey Jack-stuffed poblano peppers. The stuffed poblano pepper is roasted on the grill until blackened. The pork is coated in garlic, cinnamon and a mystery spice blend before grilling. Three house made salsas (a tomato, onion and chili mexicana; a blended tomato rojo and a tomatillo based salsa verde) accompany the dish. Before trying this dish, he sat down with another special guest, actor/comedian Kevin Pollak, who emphasized his enjoyment of the restaurant's dishes and even broke out his impression of Christopher Walken to boot. For the challenge segment, Adam headed up to Rib Line in San Luis Obispo for the "Brahma Bull Challenge." Challengers must eat sandwich featuring three pounds of barbecued tri-tip steak loaded into a 1-pound sourdough roll, with half of the steak topped with half a pint of barbecue sauce ("San Luis Obispo-style") and the other half topped with half a pint of salsa ("Santa Maria-style"). Adam recruited high school history teacher Naader Reda for this challenge. Naader's task was to finish the entire 4-pound sandwich faster than a then-record time of 42 minutes. If he could finish, he would win a trophy and be allowed free lunch at the restaurant every Friday for as long as he held the record time. Rib Line specializes in serving tri tip, the signature dish of Central California BBQ. To make the sandwich, and entire loaf of sourdough bread is cut in half and coated in garlic parmesan butter before baked. a full tri tip has marinated in a secret dry rub for over 12 hours before being grilled over red oak. In a pre-challenge Indiana Jones-themed fantasy segment, Adam's advice to Naader was to vary the flavor of the sandwich. Prior to Naader, just two people out of 50 have previously finished this challenge. Naader started the challenge out strong by first attacking the beef in forkfuls, finishing nearly half of it in the first five minutes. He also strategized by keeping a cup of au jus at his side for even more flavor. Adam then advised him to not leave all the bread for last, so Naader started breaking the bread apart and eating pieces of it with the steak and au jus. Soon, he asked for even more au jus. Upon getting it, he decided to drench the entire sandwich in it, a move which very much impressed Adam. With nearly 10 minutes left, Naader hit the food wall, but stayed determined and went on to finish the entire sandwich with just 2 minutes to spare. His victory thereby set a new challenge record time of 40 minutes. Post-episode update: Reel Inn in Malibu closed down in 2025 after it was destroyed in the Palisades Fire. However, the owners hope to eventually reopen.
| Street Eats Special | 17 (75) | September 28, 2011 | Food | White Rabbit Burrito |
This special episode of Man v. Food Nation showcased some of the best street vendor food from across the nation. First off, Adam visited the Taco Bus in Tampa, a school bus turned food truck where they serve a wide variety of Mexican fare from chicharrons to the shrimp burrito to the butternut squash tostada. However, Adam was there to try the "puerco asado" taco - topped marinated Boston butt roast pork (mixed with onions, jalapeños, achiote and other spices) topped with cabbage, tomatoes, marinated red onions, and salsa verde. Adam's second stop was at the Wafels & Dinges truck in New York City, which features Belgian waffles that can be topped with just about anything from smores to bacon. The waffles are made with beaten egg whites and yeast. Adam tried his Belgian waffle barbecue-style: with pulled pork, coleslaw, barbecue sauce, and a "coolickle" (a pickle soaked in Kool-Aid for two days). Lastly, Adam ventured to Los Angeles and paid a visit to the White Rabbit truck, which features the massive White Rabbit Burrito Challenge: a 2-foot, 6-pound Filipino burrito loaded with marinated chicken adobo, garlic fried rice, six fried eggs, and 12 slices of Swiss cheese, all contained within six 13.5-inch tortillas. The tortillas are laid on the grill and six of the slices of swiss cheese are placed down the center, followed by six scoops of garlic fried rice. Three pounds of braised chicken that was soaked in the proprietary marinade are grilled and placed in the burrito followed by the fried eggs. Lastly, the final six slices of cheese top the burrito fillings. Adam recruited entertainer and "jack-of-all-trades" Sydney "Big Dawg" Colston for this challenge, which had only been defeated by two people out of almost 100 prior to this episode's taping. Big Dawg had 45 minutes to finish the burrito. At the start, he looked strong, taking big bites of the burrito and finishing the first two pounds easily. Sydney took sips of Sprite to keep himself hydrated, but that eventually came back to bite him (Adam emphasized this by noting that the soda would make all the rice in Big Dawg's stomach expand). He began to slow down at about the 30-minute mark. Adam intervened by showing him how to do the "shake-down shimmy", which would allow the food to go down easier. Big Dawg then went back to eating the burrito as fast as he could. However, he ran out of time after consuming a little over three pounds of the burrito.
| St. Paul, MN | 18 (76) | October 5, 2011 | Man | Lucifer (Lucy) |
Adam visited St. Paul. He first visited Punch Neapolitan Pizza, which creates their pizzas the very same way the original pizzas were created in Naples many years ago. This restaurant, in fact, has an authentic Vera Pizza Napolitana (V.P.N.) certification. There, Adam tried a Margherita pizza, which is prepared the traditional way: with San Marzano tomato sauce, olive oil, fresh basil, and buffalo mozzarella cheese, all before being cooked in an 800-degree (F) wood-burning oven for 90 seconds. Next, Adam headed to Rack Shack BBQ in nearby Burnsville to try the "Hobo": a smoked potato skillet topped with barbecue sour cream, pulled pork, beef brisket, and essentially every side dish in the restaurant, including corn bake (cream corn and kernal corn with Texas toast baked on top), beans, jalapeño macaroni and cheese, and blue cheese-bacon coleslaw, and also topped with a creamy cheddar sauce. For the challenge, taking place at Tin Cup's, Adam enlisted law school graduate Jon Wolf to take on the Lucy Challenge: 2 1.5-pound spicy "Lucifer" burgers, plus 2 pounds of fries, altogether weighing in at 5 pounds. To form each "Lucifer" burger, three slices of pepper jack cheese and half a pound of jalapeño peppers are put onto a half pound burger patty. Another half pound patty is then put on top for form the ultra hot Juicy Lucy. After grilling and plating, each burger is then drenched in "Lucifer sauce" - a mixture of steak sauce, "extreme" hot sauce, and jalapeños. Jon had just 45 minutes to beat this challenge, which boasts a 99% failure rate. He was also doing this challenge to try to win a date with his long-time crush, Melissa, who was on hand with the crowd at Tin Cup's. In a Breakfast Club-themed fantasy segment before the challenge, Adam advised Jon to eat fast, keep moving, and combine the fries with the burgers. At the start of the challenge, Jon was surprised by the burger's heat after the first bite, so he decided to pull the first one apart to eat it faster. Following Adam's advice to incorporate the fries with each bite, Jon managed to finish the first burger in just 10 minutes. By this point, the spiciness of the challenge hardly fazed him, and at about 20 minutes in, he was halfway through the challenge, but soon he hit the food wall. Adam had Jon get up and stretch a bit to help the food go down, but Jon was still struggling, as he noted that the cheese was starting to congeal. Then, Melissa came by to give Jon a kiss on the cheek, and it inspired him enough to keep eating (using ketchup to add flavor to the fries) and ultimately finish the challenge with just 2 minutes to spare. With his victory, Jon finally got his wish, as Melissa agreed to go out with him. Post-episode update: Tin Cup's closed in its original form as a dive bar in 2018. New owners opened an Ethiopian restaurant in the same location and incorporated Tin Cup's into the new restaurant's name. Post-episode update: In 2018, the Rack Shack relocated from Burnsville to Eagan, just a 3-minute drive east from the original location. Then in June 2025, they opened a location at the Elko Speedway.
| Cincinnati, OH | 19 (77) | October 12, 2011 | Food | 110 Reuben |
Adam paid a visit to the "Queen City", Cincinnati. The first locale on Adam's visit was Tom + Chee, a grilled cheese establishment located across the river from Cincinnati in Newport, Kentucky. There menu changes often and can range from mac and cheese grilled cheese to a variety of grilled cheese donuts. There, Adam first tried a blueberry-blue cheese donut (crumbled blue cheese, melted mozzarella cheese, and blueberry compote between two halves of a grilled donut) and then tried the "Armagoetta", a sandwich of Pepper Jack cheese, hot cherry peppers, goetta sausage and crispy fried onions topped with sweet hot mustard, all between two differing slices of butter-grilled bread (one of dark rye and one of sourdough). Next, Adam checked out Camp Washington Chili parlor which has operated since 1940. Cincinnati is considered by some as the chili capital of the world where they serve over 2,000,000 pounds a year. The city was the first where chili was poured over spaghetti. You can try is as a "three way" with chili and shredded Wisconsin cheddar cheese over spaghetti, a "four way" by adding beans or chopped white onions, or like Adam tried as a "five Way" with beans and onions. The chili is a blend of beef, onions, garlic and secret spices that include cinnamon. The final location, Izzy's, was the setting for the 110 Reuben Challenge: a 5.5-pound Reuben sandwich constructed of 1.10 pounds of corned beef, a giant potato pancake, 3 pints (6 cups) of sauerkraut, Thousand Island dressing, and 8 slices of Swiss cheese, all inside a 2.5-pound rye loaf. The challenge, which has only been beaten twice in over 50 attempts, was to be completed within 30 minutes. The challenger was youth baseball coach Adam Turer, who attempted this challenge previously, but failed after eating 3 pounds of it. Among the crowd, Turer's baseball team was there to support him, along with his wife and son. During his rematch, Turer kept a bowl of soup by his side to help soften the bread. He looked strong at first, finishing half the sandwich in the first 15 minutes. At about 20 minutes in, though, he began to struggle, so Adam provided him with a wet towel and let him stretch a bit before continuing the sandwich. Though he fought valiantly, Turer's time expired after consuming 4.5 pounds of the sandwich, which was his new personal best.
| Rochester, NY | 20 (78) | October 19, 2011 | Food | Atomic Bomb |
In this episode, Adam visited Rochester, New York, located near the famed Watkins Glen International race track. First on his visit was Campi's, home to oversized sandwiches known as "bombers". They serve up many varieties from the Italian sausage to the chicken parmesan. Adam tried a steak bomber, which features sliced chuck steak topped with sauteed onions, mushrooms and peppers, Provolone cheese, and Rochester's signature topping: hot sauce (in this case, meat sauce mixed with spices). To make the steak bomber, a 12-inch bun is buttered and grilled. The chuck steak is sliced and fried with the onion, mushrooms and peppers mixed in during the grilling. Slices of provolone are added to the sandwich before being topped with the hot meat sauce. Adam's next stop was Nick Tahou Hots, known for their famous "Garbage Plates". A garbage plate weighs nearly two pounds and consists of many different things on the menu. The original garbage plate consisted of hots dogs, baked beans and home fries, but many now include 10–12 ingredients. Adam's Garbage Plate consisted of four bases (baked beans, macaroni salad, French fries and home fries) topped with cheeseburgers and red hots, as well as mustard, chopped onions, and the restaurant's version of Rochester hot meat sauce. For the challenge, Adam visited Sticky Lips Barbecue to help NASCAR racer Joey Logano take on the 5-pound Atomic Bomb Challenge: a double cheeseburger topped with pulled pork, bacon, lettuce, tomatoes, red onions, and a half-pound of spicy Rochester meaty hot sauce (made especially spicy with the addition of chopped fresh habaneros), plus a pound of fries also topped with the Rochester hot meat sauce. Two half pound hamburger patties are topped with a full pound of pulled pork that had been smoked for 12 hours. Four ounces of shredded cheddar cheese cover one patty and slices of provolone cover the other. Lettuce, tomatoes and onion and eight slices of bacon are placed on the top half of the bun. The bottom part of the bun with the meaty concoction is then covered with the half pound of spicy meat sauce. Joey had 30 minutes to finish this challenge, which – in over 200 attempts – had never been defeated. Before the challenge, Adam had a taste of the hot sauce, and was surprised by its heat. Joey started strong, finishing the first pound in just 5 minutes. Adam soon advised Joey to focus on the fillings and leave the bread and fries for last. At about the 20-minute mark, though, Joey started to slow down, but he remained determined to finish the entire challenge (even finishing half of the fries in only a minute). Ultimately, though, he was unable to finish the challenge in the allotted 30 minutes and the challenge remained undefeated. Post-episode update: Campi's closed for good in May 2025 after its owner unexpectedly died. Post-episode update: Sticky Lips BBQ closed the location the show aired from in October 2018 due to the high cost of running two restaurants. It closed its last remaining location in July 2024 when the owner decided to retire.
| Omaha, NE | 21 (79) | October 26, 2011 | Food | Pig Wing |
Adam visited Omaha, Nebraska. The first stop on his visit was Amato's, which features dishes ranging from ricotta-berry pancakes to homemade Italian sausage sandwiches. Adam was there to try a large Italian sandwich called "The Godfather," which features three quarters of a pound each of six meats (mortadella, Cotto and hard salami, bone-in ham, capicola, and pepperoni) all grilled and topped with four cheeses (hot pepper, mozzarella, provolone and American), olive salad, and roasted red peppers, served inside toasted Italian twist bread. All the meats are assembled and placed on the grill where it is seared and steamed. The bread is split in half and covered in a buttery, garlic cheese spread before being grilled. The cheeses are then stacked on the meats before the olive salad and peppers top the sandwich. Next on Adam's agenda was to try some authentic Omaha steaks, and for this he went to The Drover, which is known for their famous "Whiskey steaks" - steaks marinated in whiskey. There, Adam tried the "Omaha strip", a New York strip with the bone left in it that is not even on the menu. The strip is approximately 1 1/2 inches thick and weighs about 20 ounces. When they are ordered, the steaks are marinated in a secret blend of spices with whiskey added for 15 minutes before grilling. They are grilled for approximately 10 minutes to medium rare temperature. The challenge took place at Starsky's Bar and Grill in South Omaha, where Adam coached KHUB radio DJ Matt Price through the Pig Wing Challenge. Matt had an hour to eat five pounds of "pig wings" (pork shanks on small bones, much like normal chicken wings) and three pounds of corn nuggets (a mixture of corn niblets and creamed corn in a corn meal batter deep-fried into nugget form). The Pig Wing Challenge is five times the size of a regular order. Made out of the meat from a pig's legs, it takes about 35 pig wings to equal five pounds. Out of dozens that had attempted this challenge prior to Matt, only one had ever succeeded. Armed with a variety of sauces for more flavor, Matt spent the first 10 minutes of the challenge taking the pork off the bones and mashing up the corn nuggets before tackling both simultaneously. Matt finished the first two pounds of the challenge at the 20-minute mark. At the 25-minute mark, Adam suggested to him that he start eating the wing-nugget mish-mash in separate bowls. Matt did just that and finished the third pound at 35 minutes, but then he hit the food wall. After a moment, he pressed on, and at the 45-minute mark finished the fifth pound of the challenge. Though he ate to the very last second, however, he could not finish the challenge in time. Post-episode update: Amato's Cafe and Catering closed for good in June 2019. Post-episode update: The Starsky's Bar and Grill location where the show air permanently closed in 2014 due to a large loss of revenue when Rosenblatt Stadium was demolished and the College World Series shifted to its new location. Yelp reviewers posted that its second location closed in early 2024 without a public announcement detaling a specific reason.
| Green Bay, WI | 22 (80) | November 2, 2011 | Food | Gravedigger |
Adam stopped in Green Bay, home to the NFL's Green Bay Packers, with visits to locales in the vicinity of the Packers' home, Lambeau Field. This episode was filmed before the Packers' 2011 season opener at home against the New Orleans Saints. The first stop on Adam's visit was Kroll's West Restaurant, which is known for serving nearly everything (especially the meats) with butter on top. Adam first tried a buttered double cheeseburger before moving on to their prime rib sandwich, which features 3 ounces of shaved prime rib placed on a toasted roll then topped with sauteed mushrooms, onions and peppers, as well as butter, and served with a side of buttery au jus. Adam's second stop was Curly's Pub, located inside Lambeau Field, where he tried their fried cheese curds and Johnsonville Beer Brats (bratwurst soaked in a mix of beer and onions, then placed in a bun while topped with sauerkraut). The final stop, Champion's Sports Bar and Grill, was the setting for the Gravedigger Challenge; a 93-ounce (5 pounds, 13 ounces) burger (named after the Packers' former nose tackle, Gilbert "The Gravedigger" Brown, who wore number 93) topped with 8 slices of American cheese, plus lettuce, tomatoes and onions, all on a large buttered bun. For this two-person challenge, Adam recruited University of Wisconsin-Oshkosh students (and big-time Packers fans) Zach Woolever and Harrison Bowden, whom had an hour to defeat this challenge; the odds were stacked against the pair as no two-person team had ever beaten this challenge prior to them. The burger was served to them by Brown himself, who was among the cheering fans on hand at Champion's, as was former Packers wide receiver Antonio Freeman; alongside Adam, both would serve as inspiration for the duo. Zach and Harrison started strong by eating two pounds of the burger in the first 15 minutes, as Adam advised them to take small bites and keep a slow and steady pace. The duo reached the 4-pound mark by the halfway point; shortly thereafter, though, they both hit the food wall. On Adam's suggestion, the burger was reheated, which would make it juicy again as well as melt the cheese further; this strategy shaved about 10 minutes off the pair's time. With 10 minutes left in the challenge, the burger was brought back and they resumed eating, but they ran out of time with only a little bit of the burger and bun to go and the challenge remained undefeated. Post-episode update: Multiple reviewers on Yelp and Trip Advisor posted that Champion's Sports Bar and Grill has permanently closed.
| Savannah, GA | 23 (81) | November 9, 2011 | Man | Voodoo Juice |
Adam headed south to Savannah, Georgia. For his first stop, he checked out Sweet Potatoes Endearing Food, known for their Southern cooking and a place that Adam calls one of his favorite restaurants anywhere. He tried their peach-glazed barbecue chicken: a fryer chicken prepared with a unique barbecue sauce combining canned peaches and Trinity (onions, peppers, celery). Half of a fryer is soaked in an aromatic marinade that includes paprika, thyme and soybean oil before roasting for 45 minutes. The special peach bbq glaze is then made by combining sauteed Trinity with canned Georgia peaches (used so that the syrup adds to the sauces flavor). The glaze then coats the chicken for a second layer of flavor. He also enjoyed their banana pudding, which he says is the best ever. Next on Adam's Savannah visit was Tubby's Tank House in nearby Thunderbolt, where they are known for their freshly caught shrimp that are caught in shrimping boats that operate just outside the restaurant in the nearby Wilmington River. Adam tried the "Low Country Boil," a dish combining steamed Atlantic white shrimp, Canadian snow crab, red potatoes, corn on the cob, and smoked sausage. Boiling water is readied with fresh lemons and seafood seasonings. The potatoes are added and boiled for four minutes. The sausage is then added before the corn on the cob and crab. After another three minutes, the shrimp are added and boiled until they float in the water. The challenge was taped at Angel's BBQ on September 15, where Adam coached twin brothers Jamal and Jamil Williams through the Voodoo Juice Challenge, a 1-pound pulled pork sandwich topped with "Voodoo Juice" which a hot sauce composed of a blended mix of Sourwood honey, minced garlic, vinegar, approximately two ounces of chile de árbol (five times hotter than a jalapeño), habanero (60 times hotter), berry shaped tepin (80 times hotter), and ghost chilies (more than 200 times hotter). The chilies are chopped and added including all stems and seeds. Four ounces of the sauce top the one pound sandwich. The bun is also dusted with a mix of spices (including hickory smoked salt, smoked paprika, black pepper, cayenne pepper and dried chile de árbol, habaneros and ghost chilies) known as "Devil's Dandruff." Adam tried the sandwich, but had to drench the heat with honey. The twins, each with their own sandwich, had only 5 minutes to beat this challenge. Each armed with a cup of milk, they took their first few bites before the heat of the sauce kicked in. They did not let the sauce faze them as they kept eating, sipping their milk as they went. But soon, Jamal ran out of milk. Jamil, who ultimately found his sandwich far too hot for him, surrendered and then helped Jamal by giving him the rest of his milk. This ultimately helped Jamal, and he went on to finish his sandwich with no time to spare. For his victory, Jamal was given a free t-shirt. Post-episode update: Sweet Potatoes Endearing Food, later renamed Sweet Potatoes Kitchen underwent an ownership change in 2024. The restaurant permanently closed in early February 2026 when the new owners posted on their Facebook page "Due to financial challenges and hardships related to former ownership and partnerships, we are unable to continue operations at this time." Post-episode update: The owners of Angel's BBQ closed the restaurant in August 2016 to spend more time with family.
| Feast Special | 24 (82) | November 16, 2011 | Man | Leg of Beast Feast |
This special episode of Man v. Food Nation is centered around Thanksgiving-style feasts, all in preparation for the namesake holiday. Adam's first stop was at the Plymouth Plantation in Plymouth, Massachusetts to experience a 17th Century-style Thanksgiving feast, which features turkey, stuffing, mashed potatoes and gravy, seethed mussels, beets, and stewed pompion. Next, Adam traveled to Side Street Inn in Oahu, Hawaii for a Hawaiian feast which includes pan-fried island pork chops, boneless Kalbi short ribs, seared ahi tuna, Opakapaka (both steamed and fried), garlic fried chicken, and Hawaiian fried rice. Then, he tried an authentic "Amish Farm Feast" at the Plain and Fancy Farm in Lancaster, Pennsylvania, which included golden fried chicken, beef roast, and Lancaster-style chicken pot pie. The fourth stop on Adam's Thanksgiving trip was the Skylight Inn in Ayden, North Carolina, where Adam experienced a whole hog barbecue, served with sides of coleslaw, potato salad and cornbread, plus a dessert of banana pudding. Lastly, Adam headed to Big Earl's BBQ in Scottsdale, Arizona for the undefeated Leg of Beast Feast Challenge: a 17-pound barbecue feast featuring roast pork, collard greens, five-cheese macaroni and cheese, jalapeño cornbread, a blue cheese wedge salad, and pecan pie, all of which had to be finished in under 30 minutes. Adam recruited three members each of the Scottsdale Police and Fire Departments to take this challenge on. When the clock started, Adam advised the six challengers to eat the sides first, while Adam carved the pork. Once carved, the challengers ate the pork and sides with tremendous speed. At the halfway point, 5 pounds of the pork remained, and all side dishes were finished, save the collard greens. Soon, the challengers hit the food wall, with three of them calling for lemonade to help them with the collard greens. When 5 minutes remained, 3 pounds of pork were left, so Adam advised them to put down their forks and scoop up handfuls of the pork. This tactic worked, and the challenge was defeated at the last second. For their victory, the Scottsdale Police and Fire Department members received free t-shirts and were honored with being the first challengers ever to emerge victorious in this challenge. Post-episode update: Big Earl's BBQ closed in June 2013 after a change in management and after a menu change that emphasized regional Mexican cuisine.
| Oahu, HI | 25 (83) | November 30, 2011 | Food | Moose Omelette |
Adam returned to Hawaii for the best eats on the island of Oahu. His first stop was Hank's Haute Dogs, located in Honolulu. They serve unique takes on hot dogs, such as the Soul Dog (tempura battered french fries on top of a corn dog). Adam tried their take on a Chicago style Italian beef sandwich, topped with a truffle cheese sauce, sauteed green peppers and giardiniera. He then tried the biggest hot dog on their menu, called the "Big Hawaiian" - a foot-long hot dog topped with a multitude of ingredients, including poi barbecue sauce, pickled onions, pineapple relish, slow-roasted Kalua pork and shredded cabbage. Afterwards, Adam traveled to Kahuku to experience its shrimp trucks - specifically, Giovanni's Aloha Shrimp Truck. They started serving plates of shrimp in 1993 along the Kamehameha Highway before permanently parking in Kahuku Town in 1996. They serve up just three options, scampi, lemon butter and "hot & spicy". For the scampi, a dozen Black Tiger shrimp are marinated overnight in a mixture of olive oil, hand chopped garlic and lemon butter. They are then fried and served with two scoops of rice. The "hot and spicy" shrimp have a no refund policy. A pan is coated with a piri piri pepper sauce. The shrimp are then dropped in and cooked for five minutes. After plating, more of the sauce is poured on top. For the challenge segment, Adam ventured to Moose McGillycuddy's in Waikiki to help fifth-grade teacher Lauren Takao take on the Moose Omelette Challenge; a 5-pound, 12-egg omelet filled with mozzarella, cheddar, and Jack cheeses and served over four different meats (Portuguese sausage, breakfast sausage, ham, and crumbled bacon), sauteed red and green bell peppers, onions, mushrooms, and a large pile of potatoes, all of which had to be finished in under an hour. The vegetables are sauteed before the meats are fried. The breakfast potatoes are piled on a plate, followed by the vegetables and meat. The t12 eggs are fried and then covered with slices and shredded cheese before being melted in the broiler and placed on top of the plate. This certainly proved to be a tall order for Lauren, as this challenge has defeated 95% of its challengers. Lauren started the challenge very strong by taking big bites while keeping a steady pace, even earning extra inspiration from her husband and daughter, as well as her fifth-grade students. Halfway through, though, she started to struggle, so Adam suggested she walk around her table a few times before going back to the challenge. He also ordered her a cup of black coffee to help the omelet go down easier. At 32 minutes in, Lauren finished half of the challenge. She soon finished three pounds of the omelet, but had only 15 minutes left to eat the rest of it. Fighting to the last second, Lauren ultimately ran out of time with less than two pounds of the challenge to go. Adam congratulated her on her valiant effort, taking down more than half of the challenge. Post-episode update: Moose McGillycuddy's managing partner said the reason for the Waikiki location's closure in April 2020 was due to tourism clampdown, military personnel confinements and occupancy restrictions during the COVID-19 pandemic. A fire later destroyed much of the building and its contents in February 2021. The location in Kihei remains open. Post-episode update: Hank's Haute Dogs permanently closed in 2024 when the owner decided to retire. However, they still do occasional pop up events around their original location.
| Charlotte, NC | 26 (84) | April 11, 2012 | Food | Big Eats |
Adam took a trip to the "Queen City" of the South, Charlotte, North Carolina. His first stop was The Penguin, a drive-in restaurant known for its big burgers. He tried the Penguin Double Pounder, an off-menu 2-patty concoction which featured Southern toppings such as pimento cheese and crispy fried pickles. Next, he traveled to Price's Chicken Coop to try their tasty take on crispy fried chicken, as well as fried chicken livers and chicken gizzards. For the challenge segment, Adam stopped by Jackalope Jacks to help college freshman John Allerd take on the Big Eats Challenge; John had 45 minutes to eat a plate of 25 pulled pork sliders (altogether weighing in at over 3 pounds). On the line for him should he finish was a free t-shirt, a spot on the Wall of Fame, and free lunch for a year. This challenge had only been beaten once before John's attempt. Before the challenge, Adam tried the restaurant's "Kobe Mexicali Burger", featuring a Kobe beef patty topped with pepper jack cheese, fried jalapeño peppers, pico de gallo, and guacamole. After enjoying this unique creation, Adam joined the crowd as they cheered on John to take on the Big Eats Challenge. John had an optional side of fries on the plate to help him through the challenge as well. At the start of it, John looked strong as he finished 15 sliders in the first 20 minutes, all while employing Adam's strategy of combining sliders; however, by that point, John hit the food wall. Adam then recommended to him that he just focus on one slider every three minutes. John pressed on with the challenge, but slowed down again near the end and ultimately ran out of time with about 4 sliders to go. Post-episode update: Price's Chicken Coop closed in June 2021 due to what the owner called labor shortage, rising food costs, food quality and another coin shortage. Post-episode update: Jackalope Jacks moved from its original location in Elizabeth in 2017 due to a rezoning project and opened a new location in Plaza Midwood. It was later sold to a group of new owners in August 2025. Staff confirm that they also no longer sell food "and haven't for some time" and are only a bar selling drinks.
| Jackson, MS | 27 (85) | April 11, 2012 | Food | Whammy |
In the season finale, Adam headed to Jackson, Mississippi. His first stop took him to Chimneyville Smokehouse, where he tried some hickory-smoked brisket and baby back ribs topped with the restaurant's unique smoked barbecue sauce. Next, Adam journeyed to Two Sisters Kitchen, a Southern soul food buffet, to try some country-fried steak topped with tomato gravy. Afterwards, Adam headed to Hal and Mal's to partake in a catfish po' boy, all before this week's challenge segment. The challenge was at Burgers and Blues in nearby Ridgeland where Adam's recruit, vegetarian Garrett Willingham, would do battle with the Whammy Challenge; he had a half-hour to finish a 3.5-pound triple-decker burger, stacking together three 1-pound beef patties with a variety of toppings, along with a pound of fries and a root beer float. Out of over 100 people who have attempted this challenge, 5 have succeeded. Having been away from meat for a long period of time, Garrett was more than happy to take this challenge on. He started strong by eating half a burger in the first 5 minutes, and highly enjoyed the taste of it. Shortly thereafter, the first patty was done as he continued to work on the Whammy, incorporating fries with each bite. Adam noted that because Garrett hadn't eaten meat in so long, his body would take time to acclimate to the taste. At about 15 minutes in, Garrett hit the food wall. The audience continued to cheer him on, and they suggested that Garrett start dunking the fries in the root beer float. This strategy worked and Garrett continued his battle. With only 5 minutes left, Garrett finished the float, as well as more than half the burger and fries. Though he fought hard to the end, his time ran out with still more than a pound of the challenge remaining. Though he would go back to his vegetarian ways afterwards, Garrett remarked that the burger was good and he wished he could have finished it. Post-episode update: Chimneyville Smokehouse closed its brick and mortar building to focus exclusively on catering in November 2017. Post-episode update: Two Sisters Kitchen closed in July 2017 as the owner indicated she wanted to care for her mother. Post-episode update: The Burgers and Blues owner closed the Ridgeland location where the episode was filmed and moved it to Brandon in late 2020. When the Madison location opened in May 2021, the owners changed the restaurant's name to Burgers, Blues, Barbeque.
