= Hot wiener =

Hot dog in Rhode Island cuisine

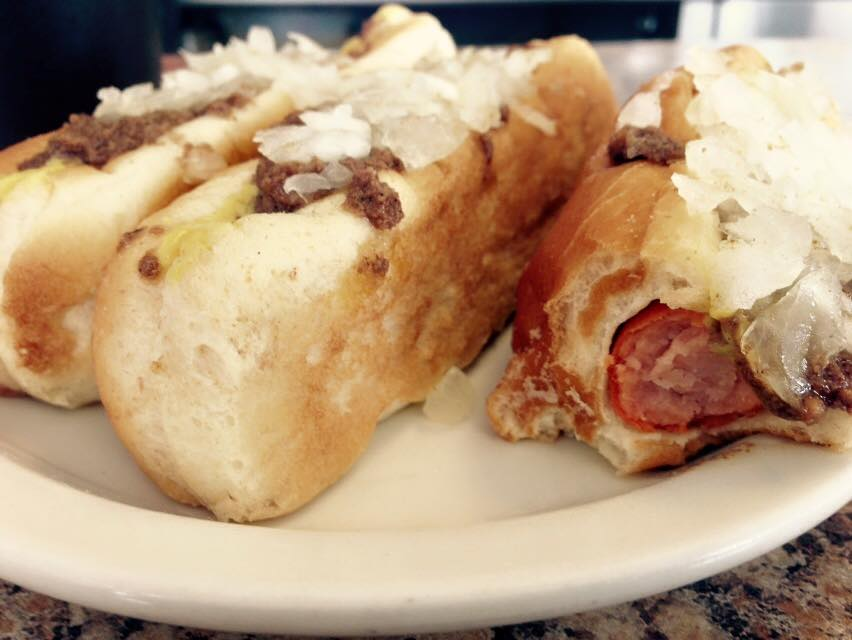
- Hot wieners
- Alternative names: New York System wiener
- Course: Main course
- Place of origin: United States
- Region or state: Providence, Rhode Island
- Serving temperature: Hot
- Main ingredients: Pork, veal, bread, meat sauce, onions, yellow mustard, celery salt
- Variations: None

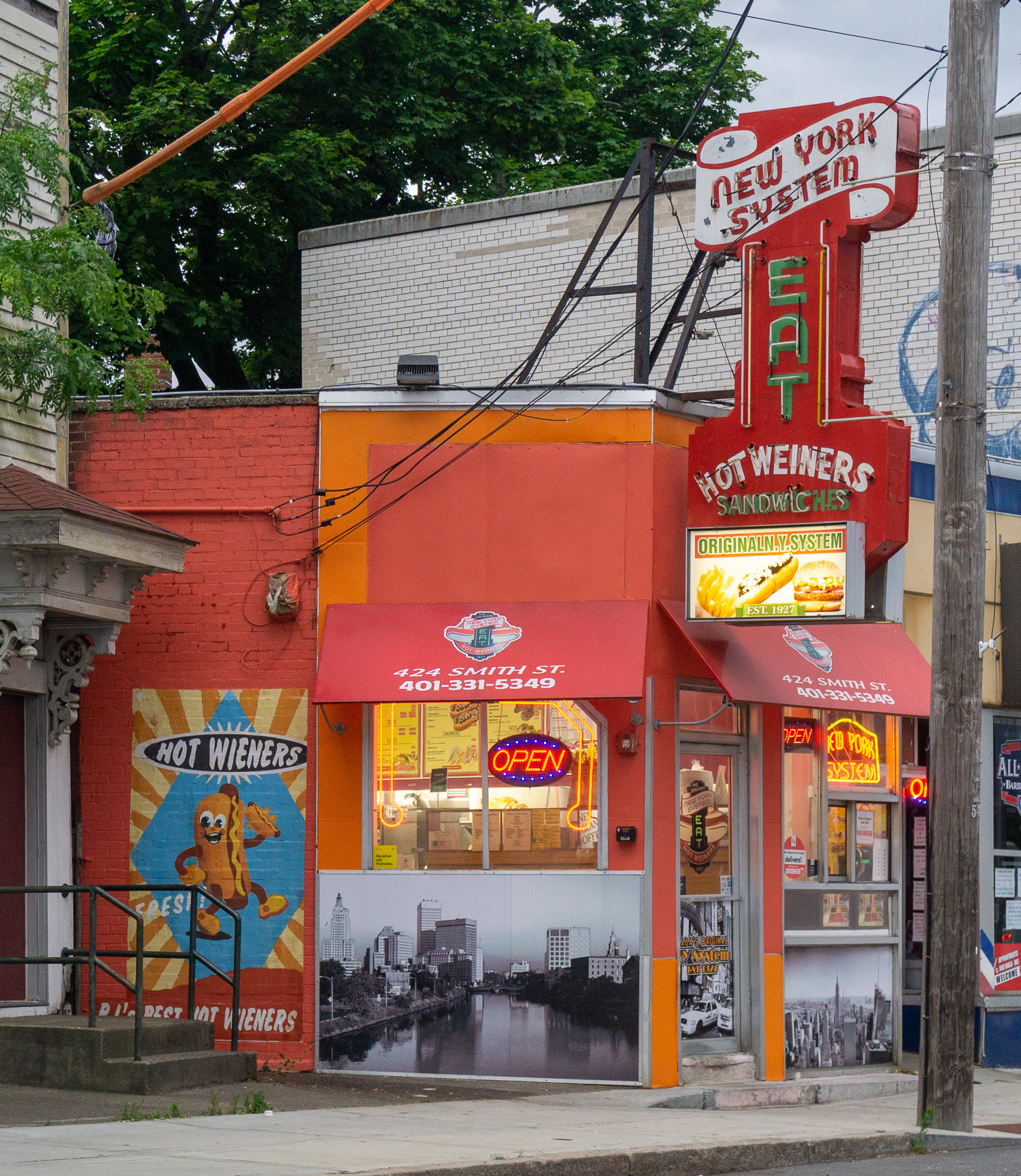
Baba's Original New York System restaurant on Smith Street in Providence

The hot wiener, also known as New York System wiener or gagger, is a staple of the food culture of Rhode Island, where it is primarily sold at "New York System" restaurants.

== Preparation ==
The traditional New York System wiener is made with beef, veal and pork, giving it a different taste from a traditional beef hot dog. Served in a steamed bun, it is topped with celery salt, yellow mustard, chopped onions, and a seasoned meat sauce. Its spices vary by vendor, but always include celery salt, and commonly also include cumin, paprika, chili powder, and allspice.

== New York System restaurants ==
The name New York System (and less commonly Coney Island System) appeared in Rhode Island in the early 20th century as a marketing strategy when hot dogs were closely associated with New York's Coney Island. By the early 1940s, a distinctly Rhode Island product and preparation had evolved among Providence's Greek community, popularized within the state such that the "wieners" served by New York Systems today bear little resemblance to the traditional Coney Island hot dog. Restaurateurs continue to use the name as a way to advertise this particular local cuisine.

The question of the oldest New York System is debated. One of the most widely known is the Olneyville New York System, opened in 1946 and named for Providence's Olneyville neighborhood, but it was the original owner's extended family who operated the Original New York System from 1927 in the Smith Hill neighborhood. Another institution, Coney Island Hot Weiners (now E. P. Weiners after various name changes) of East Providence, claims an earlier, albeit contested date of 1915.

== See also ==
- Coney Island hot dog
- List of hot dogs
- List of regional dishes of the United States
