= Sonny Bryan's Smokehouse =

Restaurant in Dallas, Texas, United States

- Company type: Private
- Industry: Restaurant
- Founded: 1958; 68 years ago in Dallas, Texas
- Founder: William Jennings Bryan Jr.
- Headquarters: Dallas, Texas
- Number of locations: 2
- Area served: Texas
- Key people: Brent Harman, President & CEO
- Website: www.sonnybryans.com

Sonny Bryan's Smokehouse is a James Beard Award-winning BBQ restaurant in Dallas, Texas that was founded by William Jennings Bryan Jr. (known as Sonny) in 1958 near the University of Texas Southwestern Medical Center. One of Dallas' oldest restaurants, it has two locations in the Dallas – Fort Worth Metroplex (DFW) and one of the largest catering companies in DFW. It is Texas' only 24/7 restaurant and 24/7 barbecue catering company.

== History ==
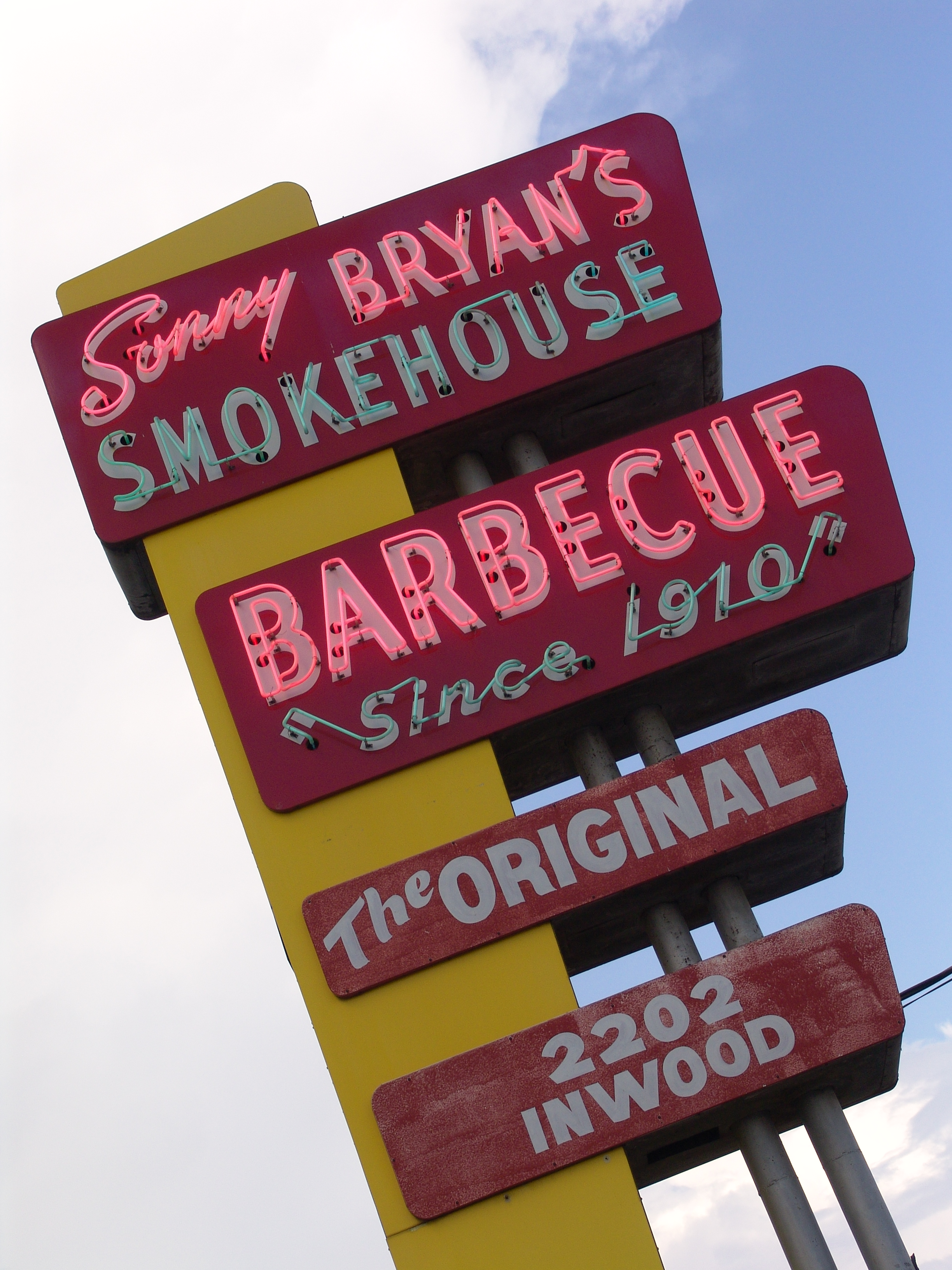
Sign in front of the original location on Inwood.

The Bryan family has operated barbecue restaurants in the Dallas area for over a century. Sonny's grandfather, Elias Bryan, first opened his Bryan's Barbecue in 1910 while Sonny's father William Jennings "Red" Bryan opened Red Bryan's Smokehouse in 1930. Sonny opened his Sonny Bryan's Smokehouse in 1958 and ran it until 1989 when he sold it to a group of Dallas investors. Bryan died from cancer just a few months after the sale.

While Bryan was alive, he had only maintained a single location and never franchised. While the new management vowed to keep the original Inwood location the same, they built additional locations. The first new location opened in the West End in 1991. By the early 2000's, Sonny Bryan's had as many as 10 locations. As a result of the COVID19 pandemic, two locations survived and by December, 2022, only the original location in Inwood and Richardson remained.

== Distinguishing Features ==
The Inwood location features old school desks as dining tables, which were first used by Sonny Bryan himself at the original location. It also features a mural by Mari Polhman, painted in 2023, which pays tribute to Dallas' rich culture history featuring several iconic elements.

To cater to workers on the late shift at the nearby hospitals, the original location on Inwood switched to a 24 hours / 7 days a week operations in May 2016.

== Celebrity Customers ==
Noted customers include Julia Child, Lyndon Baines Johnson, Dean Fearing, Emeril Lagasse, Larry Hagman, Jimmy Buffett, King Khan and the Shrines, Rachael Ray, Guy Fieri, ZZ Top, Eric Clapton and George W. Bush.

== Menu & Offerings ==
Sonny Bryan's features authentic Texas barbecue with classic smokehouse meats including brisket, ribs, pulled pork, sausage, turkey and ham as well as sides like BBQ beans, potato salad, coleslaw, mac & cheese, fried okra, green bean casserole, fries, onion rings and mashed potatoes. The menu also features specialty items such as a loaded meat potato and Frito pie.

Sonny Bryan's offers professional catering for corporate, weddings and social gatherings. Their catering capabilities allows them to cater dozens of events on the same day as well the ability to feed thousands of people. Corporate catering clients include American Airlines, SMU, UT Southwestern Medical Center and Sewell.

== Awards ==
The restaurant won a James Beard Foundation Award in 2000, a Best Barbecue Dallas award from the Dallas Observer in 2007, and several Readers' Choice Best Barbecue Awards from D Magazine for 2010, 2011, and 2012 In 2015, the chain was declared as the fourth best southern barbecue by the readers of USA Today.

== In the media ==
It has been featured in a Dallas-based episode of the Travel Channel show Man v. Food Nation, in 2011, the Dallas episode of the Cooking Channel show The Originals with Emeril, the barbecue episode of the Food Network show Rachael Ray's Tasty Travels, and the Travel Channel show 101 More Amazing Places to Chowdown, in 2014. It has been written about and favorably reviewed in Southern Living, People (magazine), the Los Angeles Times, the New York Times, the Chicago Tribune, the Houston Chronicle, and culinary books by Jane and Michael Stern

== See also ==
- List of barbecue restaurants
- List of James Beard America's Classics
- List of restaurants in Dallas
