= Olneyville New York System =

Restaurant in Providence, Rhode Island

The Olneyville New York System is a restaurant in Providence, Rhode Island, known for its hot wieners. It opened in 1946 by Anthony Stavrianakos, a Greek immigrant. The restaurant was named for Providence's Olneyville neighborhood. Stavrianakos's extended family had operated the Original New York System from 1927 in the Smith Hill neighborhood. The restaurant's signature dish, hot wieners, are never referred to as hot dogs or served with ketchup. They are distinctive to Rhode Island. Slathered with mustard, topped with meat sauce, sprinkled with celery salt and onions, and served in a steamed bun, the hot wiener is signature as are the salt and vinegar French fries. The preferred drink is coffee milk, made in Rhode Island by flavoring milk with a sweetened coffee concentrate called coffee syrup. Hot wieners with all available toppings are ordered "all the way".

== History ==
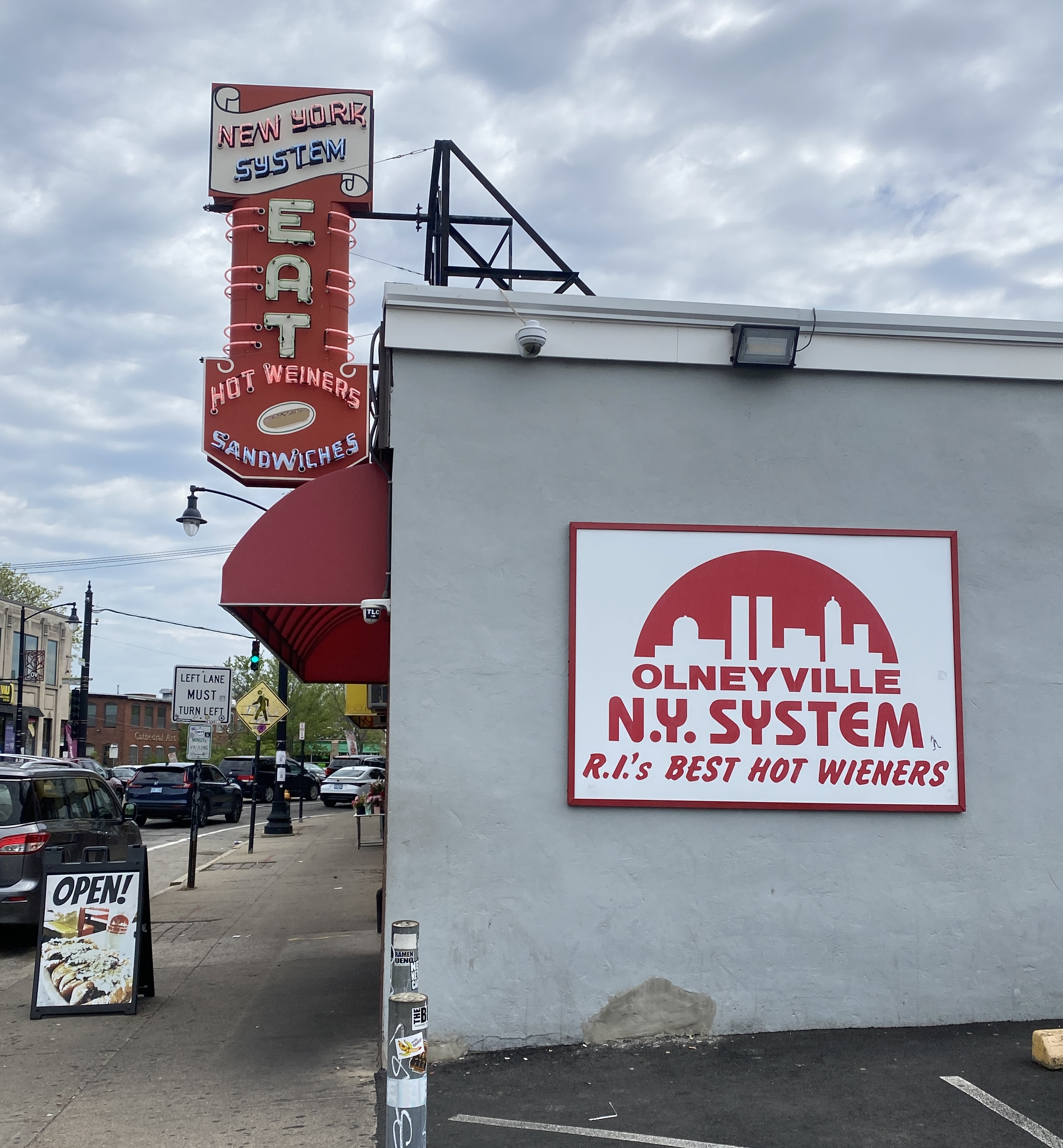
Olneyville Providence Location, 2026

Anthony Stavrianakos founded the restaurant in 1946 with his son Nicholas. Nicholas' son Peter took over from him. Peter's son Greg and sister Stephanie are fourth generation owners. They currently operate two locations, in Providence and Cranston, Rhode Island.

== Awards and honors ==
- James Beard Foundation Award America's Classic which honors "restaurants that have timeless appeal and are beloved for quality food that reflects the character of their community."
- The restaurant was featured in the TV series Man v. Food Nation (August 10, 2011) and The Best Thing I Ever Ate.
