= Lynn's Paradise Cafe =

Restaurant in Louisville, Kentucky, US

Coordinates: 38°14′12.5″N 85°43′44.0″W

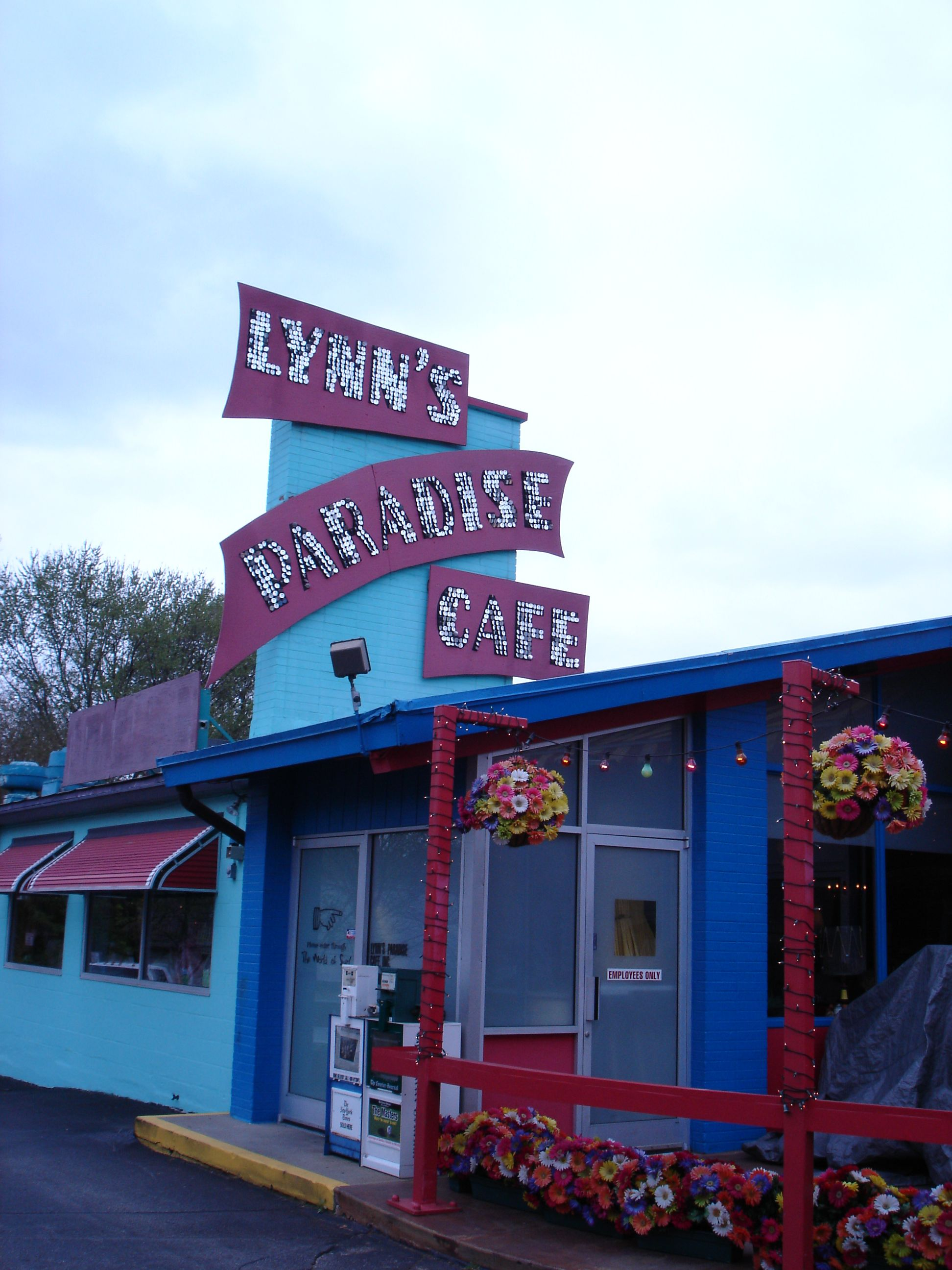
Lynn's Paradise Cafe

Lynn's Paradise Cafe was a restaurant in The Highlands neighborhood of Louisville, Kentucky. It had been open since 1991, originally in the Crescent Hill neighborhood, until it moved into a former grocery store in The Highlands. It had been featured on The Oprah Winfrey Show and Throwdown! with Bobby Flay on Food Network, where Lynn Winter, founder and chef, defeated Bobby Flay in a breakfast contest.

It was known for its kitschy style in both decor and food. Both the exterior and interior were painted vividly and decorated eclectically. It was well known for its breakfast (fruit-sauced tropical French toast, Bourbon-ball French toast, and scrambled eggs with kielbasa whipped in are typical Lynn's fare), but also served lunch and dinner. Lynn's Paradise Cafe hosted many events throughout the year, and was especially busy for a New Year's Eve and New Year's Day pajama party.

It sponsored the "Ugly Lamp Contest" at the Kentucky State Fair annually. It started when Winter was asked to judge the "Costume Poultry Show" at the Kentucky State Fair sponsored by Morton H Sachs investment manager of The Fairmont Fund; she felt that she could come up with something new.

The restaurant closed for good on January 12, 2013, in the midst of a controversy over new tipping policies at the restaurant, and accusations of labor law violations.

== Lynn's Paradise Cafe in the news ==
The restaurant has received extensive local and national media attention, including features on television programs such as The Oprah Winfrey Show "Best of", the Food Network's "Throwdown", the Discovery Channel's "Christopher Lowell Show", Travel channels all new "Chowdown Countdown" and CBS Evening News' "Travels with Harry".

In addition to print articles in The New York Times, Wall Street Journal and USA TODAY magazine, articles about Lynn's Paradise Café have appeared in popular consumer magazines such as American Style, Bon Appetit, Condé Nast Traveler, Cooking Light, Esquire, Gourmet, House Beautiful, Southern Living, Travel & Leisure, Travel Holiday, and the in-flight publications of Comair, Continental, Delta, and Southwest airlines.

Within the hospitality industry, the Paradise has been featured in Midwest Foodservice News, Meetings & Conventions, Nation's Restaurant News, Restaurant Business, Restaurant Hospitality, Restaurants & Institutions, and Wine & Spirits.

== Man v. Food Nation ==
On an episode of Man v. Food Nation set in Louisville, host Adam Richman paid a visit to Lynn's to try the restaurant's Quadruple "B" French Toast, which is dunked in buttermilk and black walnuts and topped with blackberry glaze and a Bourbon meringue. He experienced a unique way of grilling the toast when Lynn showed him how to launch it onto the grill with a 19th-century catapult.

== Controversy and closure ==
In January 2013, the restaurant released the following statement:

"For 22 years Lynn's Paradise Café has been committed to working with our employees to create a positive working environment through the challenges of an ever-changing economy. We are disappointed to learn that a few former employees and third-party agitators have some disagreements with us at this time. The issues raised arise from personnel matters that we cannot and will not discuss publicly. We are reviewing all of the issues raised, we are listening to the concerns and we will respond at an appropriate time and in an appropriate manner."

This followed the launch of a campaign by current and former employees about working conditions, including a new requirement that serving staff carry $100 at all times in order to pass out tips to other staff (compulsory tip-pooling is illegal). This included a change in the way credit card tips were given to servers. Instead of being given to them in cash at the end of the night, they were given to them in their paychecks. A worker who refused to follow the new policy, saying that "Bringing in $100 each shift is unrealistic for me because I am [a] single mother of a 2 and a half year-old-boy," was fired. A story in Salon Magazine reported that the day after the organisation Kentucky Jobs With Justice passed out fliers describing this story the restaurant was closed.

On January 12, 2013, owner and founder Lynn Winter announced Lynn's Paradise Cafe would be closing its doors stating, "The time has come to move on to new creative ventures."

In September 2013, Lynn Winter stated that the restaurant was listed for sale with a broker, and was hoping to find a buyer who would keep the restaurant's iconic name and style. Upgrades had been made to the restaurant in the time since it had closed. Winter maintained that it was her health that was to blame for the closure, as she had been diagnosed with shingles.
