= Belgian cuisine =

Culinary traditions of Belgium

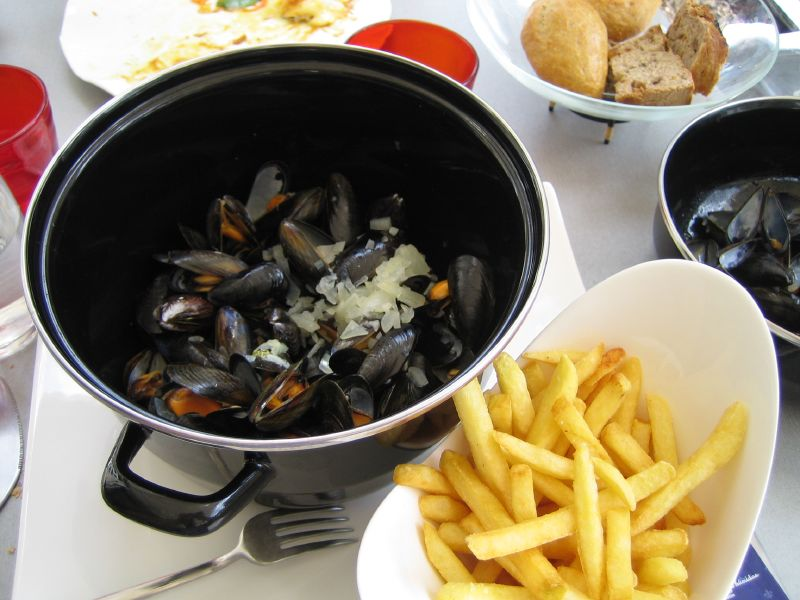
Moules-frites/Mosselen met friet, one of Belgium's national dishes

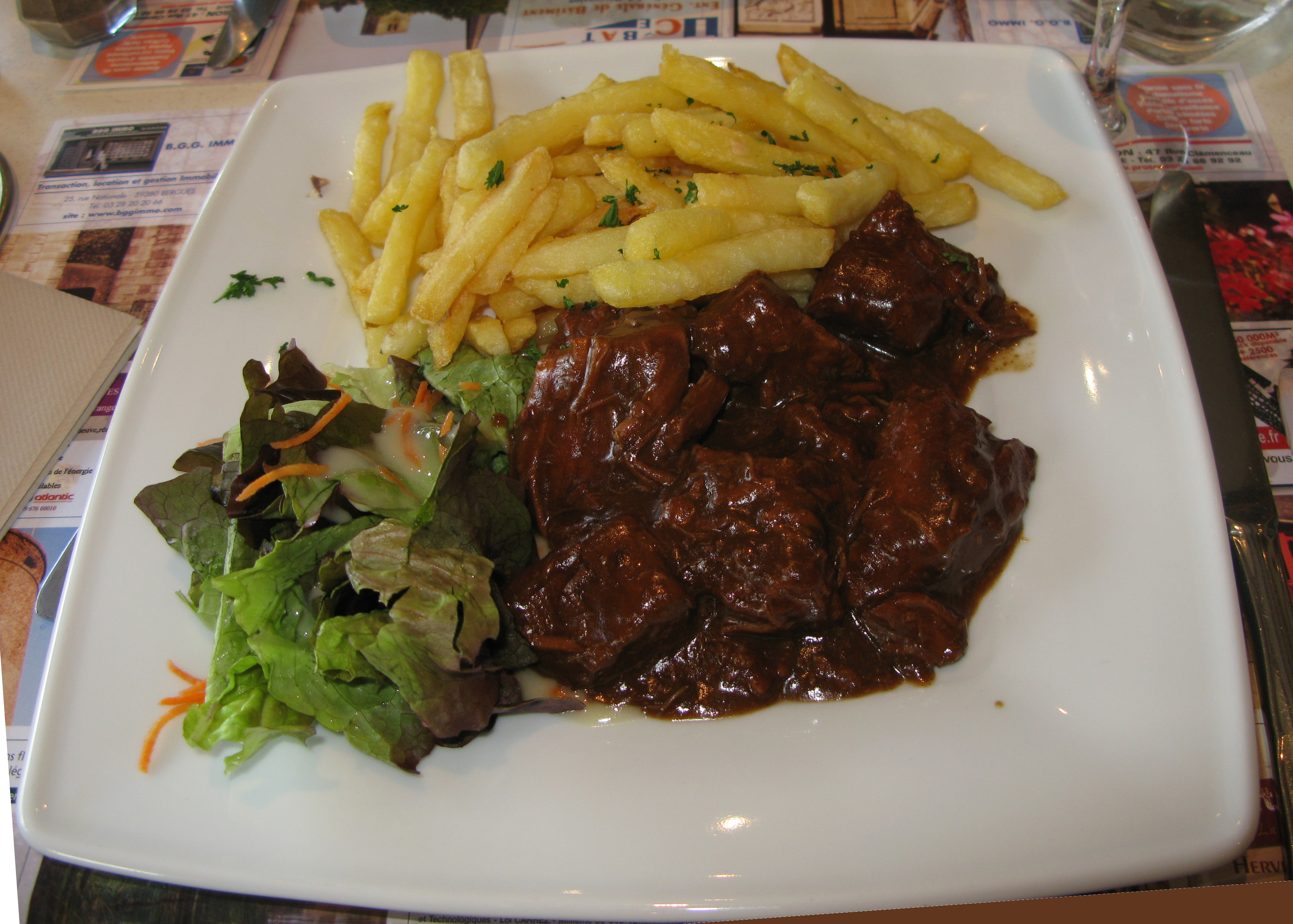
Carbonade flamande/Stoofvlees, another of Belgium's national dishes

Belgian cuisine is widely varied among regions, while also reflecting the cuisines of neighbouring France, Germany and the Netherlands. It is characterised by the combination of French cuisine with the more hearty Flemish fare. Outside the country, Belgium is best known for its chocolate, waffles, fries and beer.

Although Belgium has many distinctive national dishes, many popular international foods such as hamburgers and spaghetti bolognese are also widely enjoyed in Belgium, and most of what Belgians eat is also consumed in neighbouring countries. "Belgian cuisine" therefore usually refers to dishes of Belgian origin, or those considered typically Belgian.

Belgian cuisine traditionally prizes regional and seasonal ingredients. Typical ingredients in Belgian dishes include potatoes, leeks, grey shrimp, white asparagus, Belgian endive, horse meat and local beer, in addition to common European staples including meat, cheese and butter.

Belgium has a plethora of local dishes and products. Examples include waterzooi from Ghent, couque biscuit from Dinant, and tarte au riz from Verviers. While their local origins are acknowledged, most such dishes are enjoyed throughout Belgium.

== History ==
=== Prehistory and pre-Roman period ===
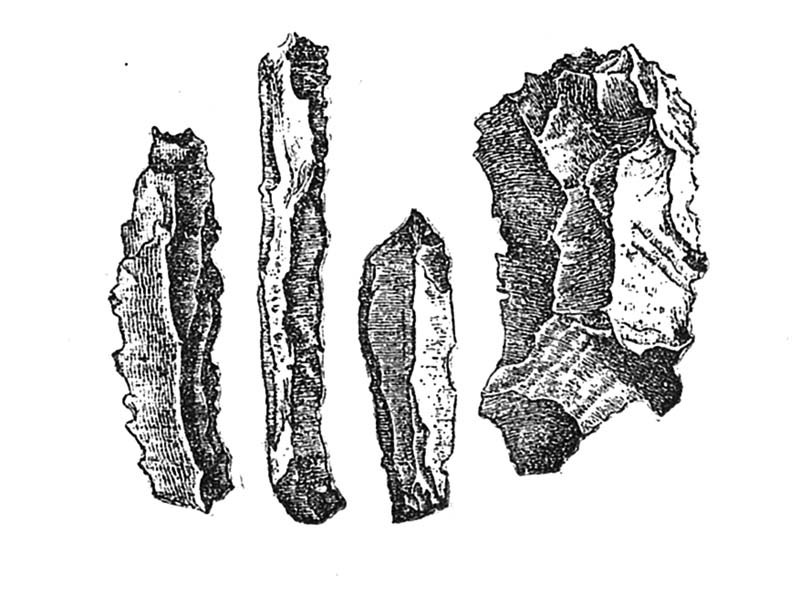
Flint knives discovered in Belgian caves

Little is known about early Belgian cuisine. It can only be assumed that it was similar to that of other early European tribes. The ancient Belgians probably kept animals like sheep and cattle, grew root vegetables, hunted for animals such as the wild boar, fished, and foraged for berries and herbs. Beer was brewed as well, although not with hops (a later discovery).

The transition from appropriation to agriculture is thought to have occurred around 2000 BC, with migrants travelling across the continent along the Danube and Rhine rivers. Small, cultivated plots of land grew primitive varieties of wheat (e.g. emmer and einkorn), barley, and legumes (e.g. lentils and peas). Goats were bred for dairy products, sheep provided wool, and pigs provided meat. Wealthier families regularly ate meat, while the poor subsisted primarily on legumes, milk, and cereals in the form of porridge or bread.

The Celtic tribes of the Belgae, who settled in Belgium around 300 BC, brought with them not only the wheeled plough and three-field crop rotation, but also enriched the diet with poultry (e.g. chicken and geese), mead and hops beer. Salt-cured beef was exported from the British Isles to the continent.

=== Gallo-Roman period ===
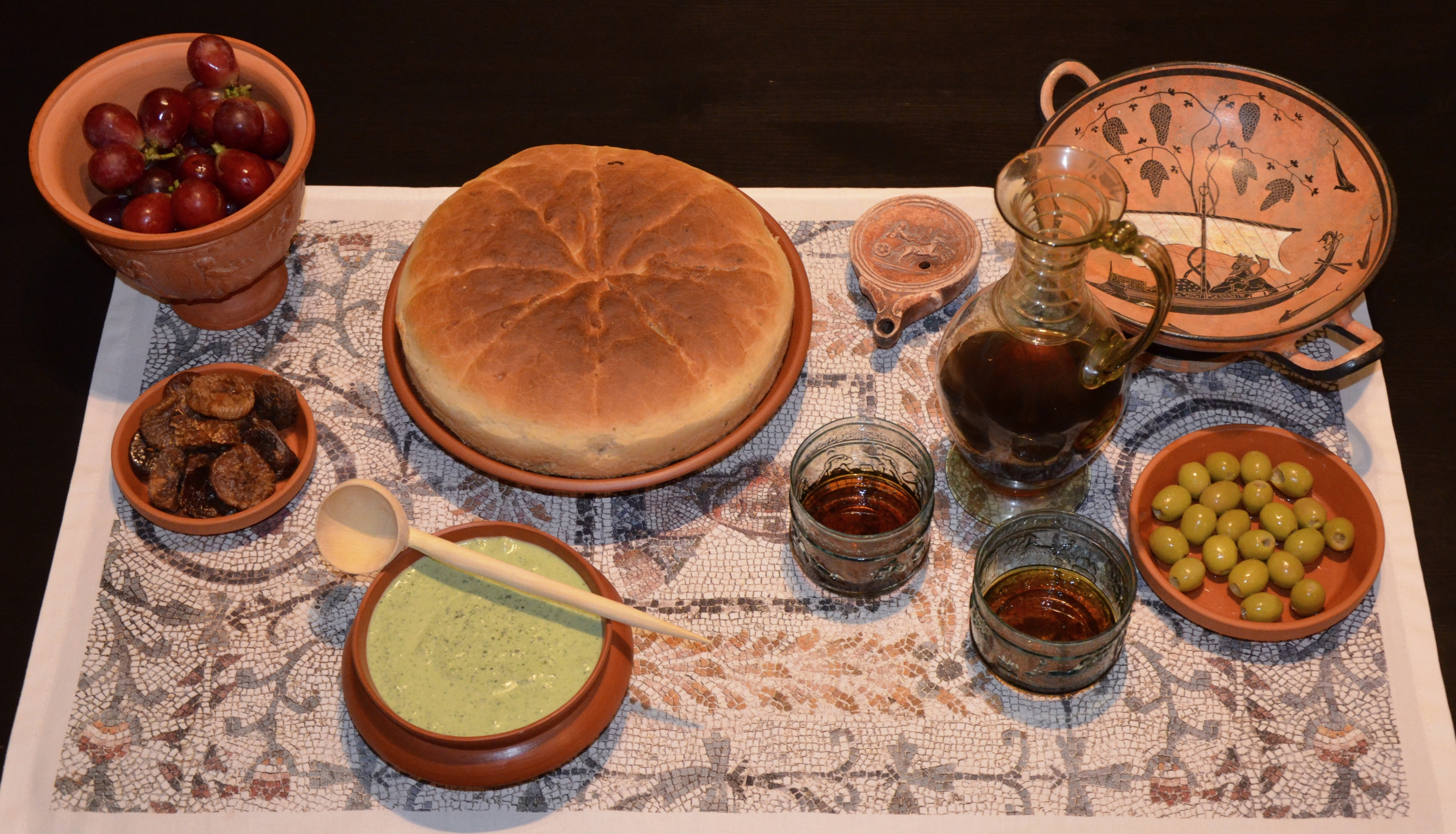
A re-creation of Mixtura cum Caseo (soft cheese with a herb purée) and Hapalos Artos (soft bread), served with olives, grapes and wine

In 54 BC, the region of northern Gaul was conquered by Caesar's troops and passed into Roman possession for four centuries. The Roman Empire had an extensive road network, which played a significant role in the economic development of the empire, and in particular, individual cities. Active trade led to the spread of products from other regions of the empire to the territory of Gallia Belgica (e.g. olive oil and wine from the Mediterranean).

To meet the growing needs of the Roman army, increasing quantities of food were required. Thus, around the year 100 AD, tracts of forest in Belgica were cleared to plant crops. Wheat, barley and spelt were grown on fertile soils, while legumes and rye were grown on less fertile soils. New varieties of vegetables and herbs were presumably introduced to the region (e.g. cabbage and other brassicas, carrots, onions, beets, dill, coriander, and thyme), as well as many fruits (e.g. apples, pears, grapes, plums, and peaches), but they only became widespread in the 2nd century AD. Livestock numbers also increased. Some regions of Belgica specialised in the production of salted ham and pork, and were known to be a large supplier of those products for many cities across the empire.

Archaeological excavations near the town of Tienen have given insight into the cuisine of Belgica in the 1st and 2nd centuries AD: cereals (e.g. wheat, spelt, and barley), legumes (e.g. lentils, peas, and beans), fruits (e.g. plums, cherries, pears, and grapes), nuts (e.g. walnuts and hazelnuts), in addition to olive oil, porridge, bread, salt, and fennel. For most of the population, the main dish was puls: cereals mixed with water or milk, heated and with a little olive oil added, then served with lentils or beans. Another important product was bread, to which honey or legumes were sometimes added when baking. Meat was rarely eaten (either fried or in vegetable soups), except freshwater fish (e.g. eel, pike, and trout). Water was the main beverage, in addition to milk, beer, and wine diluted with water and flavoured with spices. Rich people could afford to eat meat and wine more often.

=== Middles Ages and early modern ===
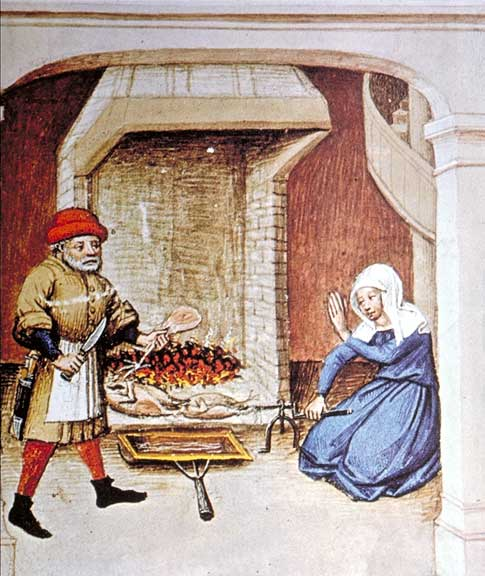
Fowl roasting on a spit. A shallow basin collects the drippings to use in sauces or for basting; The Decameron, Flanders, 1432

After the fall of the Western Roman Empire, the ruined and decayed territories of former Belgica were settled by Franks and Germanic peoples. They combined crop cultivation and livestock farming with hunting and gathering, but abandoned some of the food traditions of Belgica, such as fish sauce. They also favoured butter over olive oil and ale over wine.

At the end of the 5th century, Clovis I united the former possessions of Gaul and founded the Frankish Kingdom. During his reign, the Franks were baptised, and from then on the church began to play an increasing role in the development of the kingdom, including greatly influencing the culinary traditions of Belgium. Presumably, the history of Belgian brewing began with breweries at monasteries, and the monks also produced cheese. In addition, the Catholic Church prescribed fasting on certain days, of which there were at least 195 per year. This led to a reduction of meat products in the diet in the 10th–11th centuries, while bread, fish and eggs became more popular.

Over time, the County of Flanders and the Duchy of Brabant became some of the most economically developed regions of Europe. Instead of a three-field system, the Flemish people began to fertilise the land, which allowed them to harvest twice a year and raise more livestock. The Flemish and Brabant cities of Bruges, Antwerp, and Ghent became the largest trading cities in Europe, where the richest people settled and where goods were brought from all over the world, including spices from India and exotic fruits from warm countries.

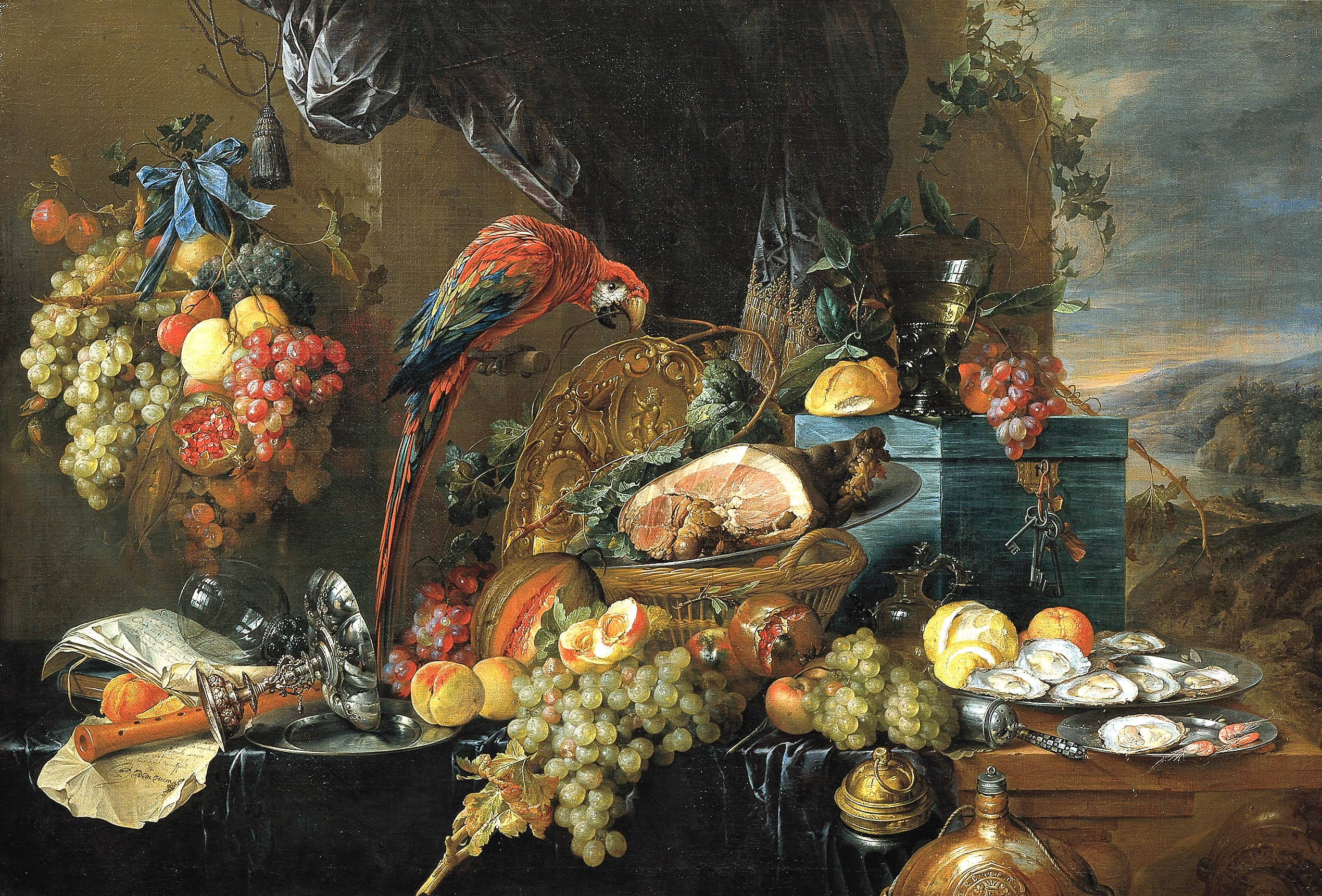
A Richly Laid Table with Parrots, Jan Davidsz de Heem, c. 1650. On the table one can see ham, seafood, bread, wine, and various kinds of fruit.

In the 13th to 15th centuries, great importance was attached to table setting and serving dishes. From then on, dishes had to be not only filling, but also pleasing to the eye. To achieve this, before serving, dishes were decorated with greens, crumbled eggs, seasoned with spices that gave colour (e.g. saffron), and poured with sauces. The food of common people consisted mainly of bread (due to low prices, bread was eaten in large quantities), beer, vegetable soups, meat, as well as fruit pies, pancakes, and waffles. Most often they ate beef and lamb; only wealthy families could afford pork, poultry and game.

In the 15th century, the port city of Antwerp became one of the most important economic centres in Europe. With the discovery of America, products such as potatoes, tomatoes, turkey, and cocoa became available. Brewing also developed intensively in Antwerp. In the 15th and 16th centuries, the first cookbooks appeared in Belgium. While the menu of wealthy Belgians consisted of a variety of dishes and elaborate desserts, the poor still subsisted on bread, beer and vegetable soups. Potatoes were initially perceived as pig feed, but by 1830 they had become the staple dish of the poor.

=== Late modern and contemporary ===
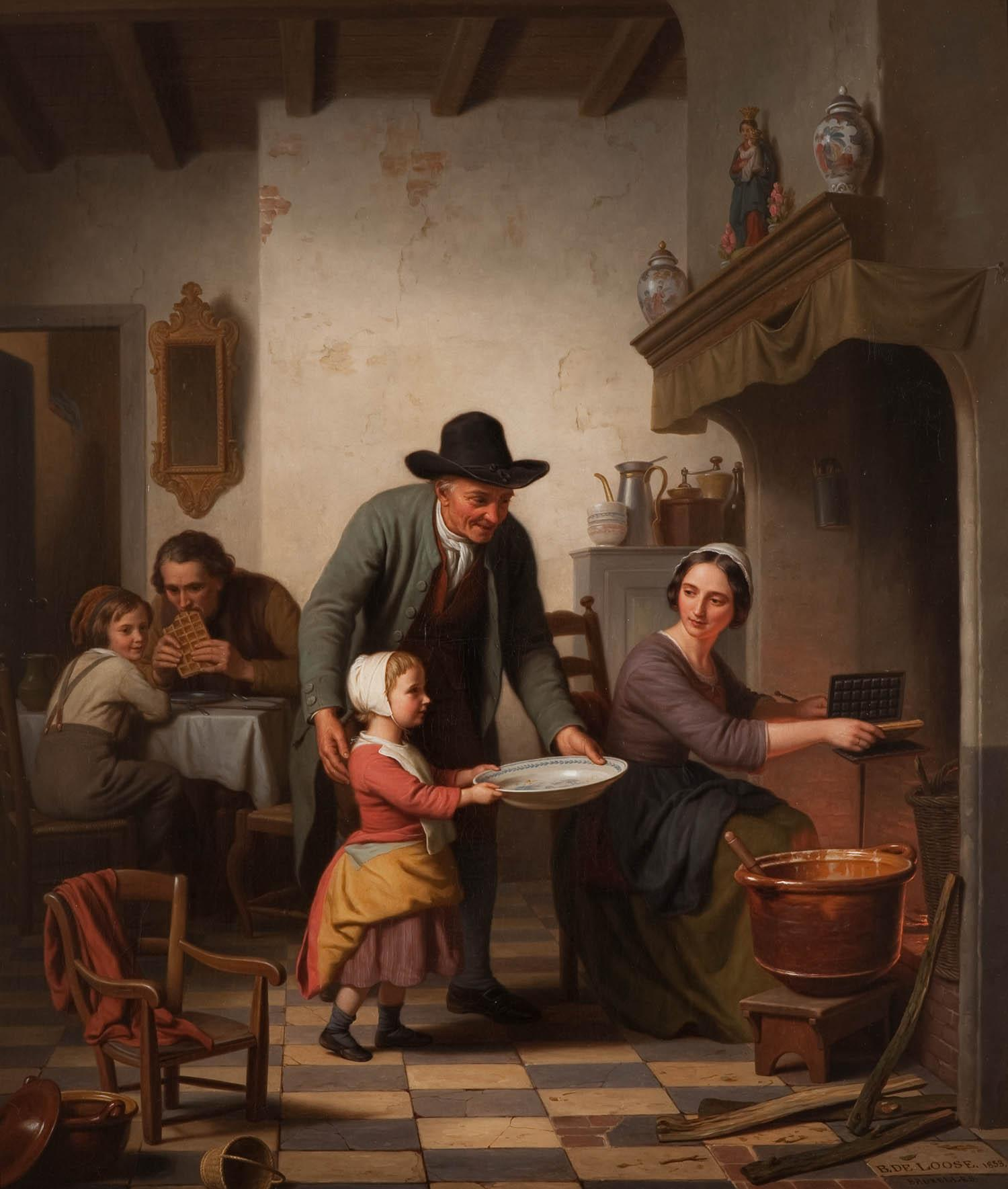
Making Waffles, Basile De Loose, 1853

In the 18th and 19th centuries, the Flemish cities lost their former importance, and the French-speaking territories of Belgium, especially Liège and Mons, took the lead. Many culinary traditions came to Wallonia from neighbouring France. First of all, various meat and fish dishes, expensive seafood (e.g. lobsters and oysters), as well as exotic fruits (e.g. pineapple and melon), became popular dishes at that time; seasonal vegetables went out of fashion. Sauces, potatoes, and offal were widely used. In the 19th century, restaurants began to appear; cookbooks were now published for the middle class as well.

As a result of the Belgian Revolution of 1830, Belgium gained its independence. Brussels was chosen as the capital of the new kingdom, where young dynamic businessmen, diplomats, and politicians settled. An increasing number of restaurants, cafés, and bars appeared in the capital, some of which were recognised as the best in Europe. Brussels chefs successfully combined French cuisine with elements of Flemish and Walloon dishes. The city is also known as the birthplace of the Belgian endive. The technique for growing blanched endives was accidentally discovered in the 1850s at the Botanical Garden of Brussels in Saint-Josse-ten-Noode.

In the 20th century, more exotic fruits and vegetables were introduced (e.g. bananas, kiwis, avocados, sweet peppers and aubergines), which gradually entered the everyday life of Belgians only with the spread of supermarkets. Many products became available to the working class. Some culinary traditions were lost because working class women, in order to save time, began to cook only the simplest and most nourishing dishes. At the same time, convenience foods and fast food became increasingly popular (e.g. spaghetti bolognese, pizza, and hamburgers), which negatively affected the nation's health. Recently, Belgians have become more health-conscious, so many families favour light, healthy meals with lots of vegetables, as well as fresh, natural products without chemical additives.

== Belgian cuisine ==
=== Appetizers ===
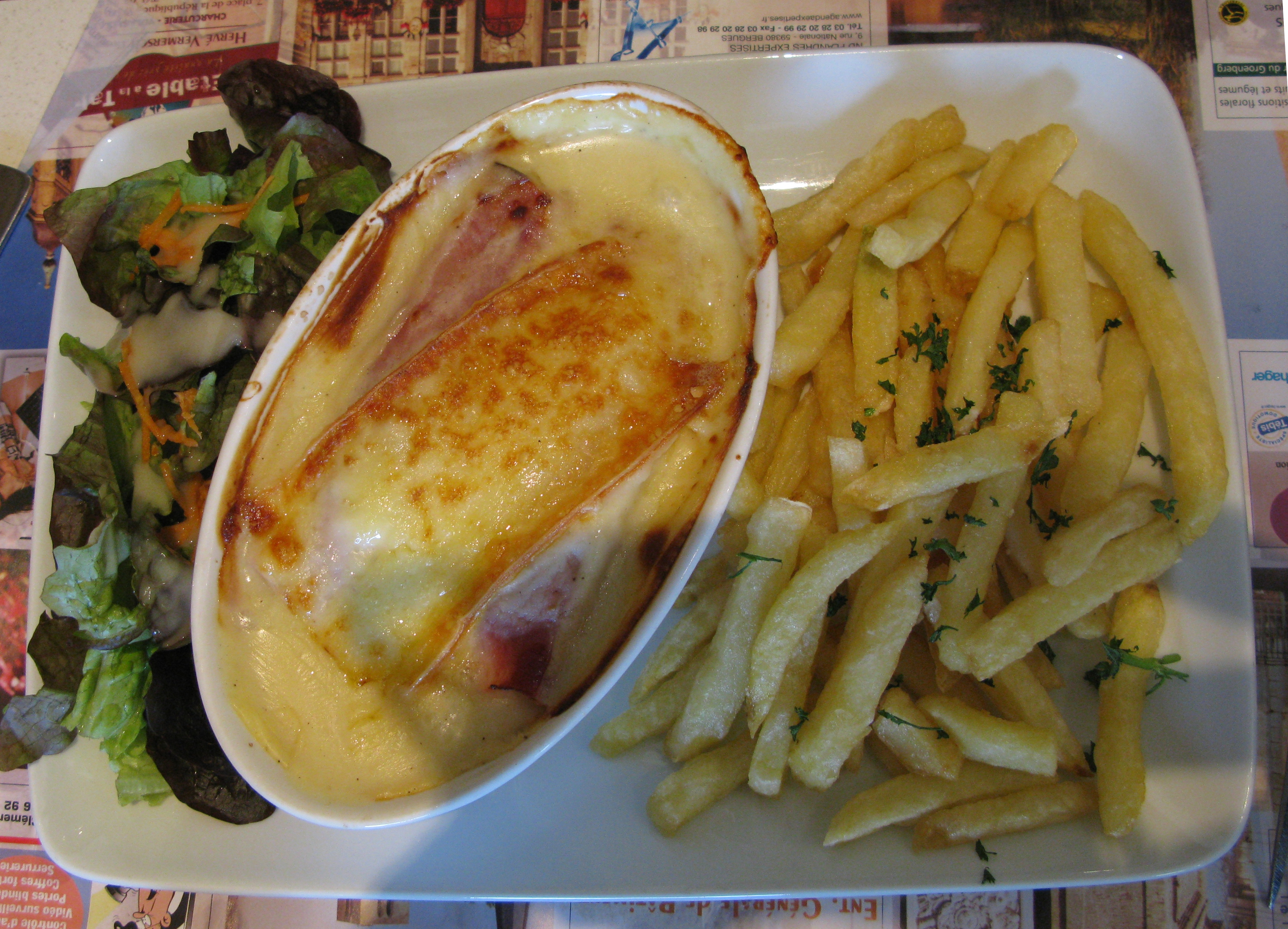
Chicons au gratin/Gegratineerd witloof

- Tartines/Boterhammen: slices of rustic bread and an uncovered spread, often pâté or soft cheese, served on a cutting board. Typical spreads include Americain, pâté, rilette and saucisson.
- Sandwiches: An oval shaped slightly-sweet bun. It is often eaten instead of regular bread, but is traditionally eaten on Sundays or after funerals.
- Jambon d'Ardenne/Ardeense ham: particularly smoked ham and pâté, often made of game such as wild boar. The forested Ardennes region in the south of Belgium is renowned for this type of food.
- Salade liégeoise/Luikse salade: a potato salad with green beans, bacon, onions and vinegar. It is usually associated with Liège.
- Croquettes aux crevettes/Garnaalkroketten: a traditional Belgian dish, these croquettes have a thick and creamy béchamel filling mixed with grey shrimps. They are often served with a slice of lemon and fried parsley.
- Tomate aux crevettes/Tomaat-garnaal: a Belgian culinary specialty, composed of a hollow tomato stuffed with peeled grey shrimps and mixed with Cocktail sauce.

=== Savoury dishes ===
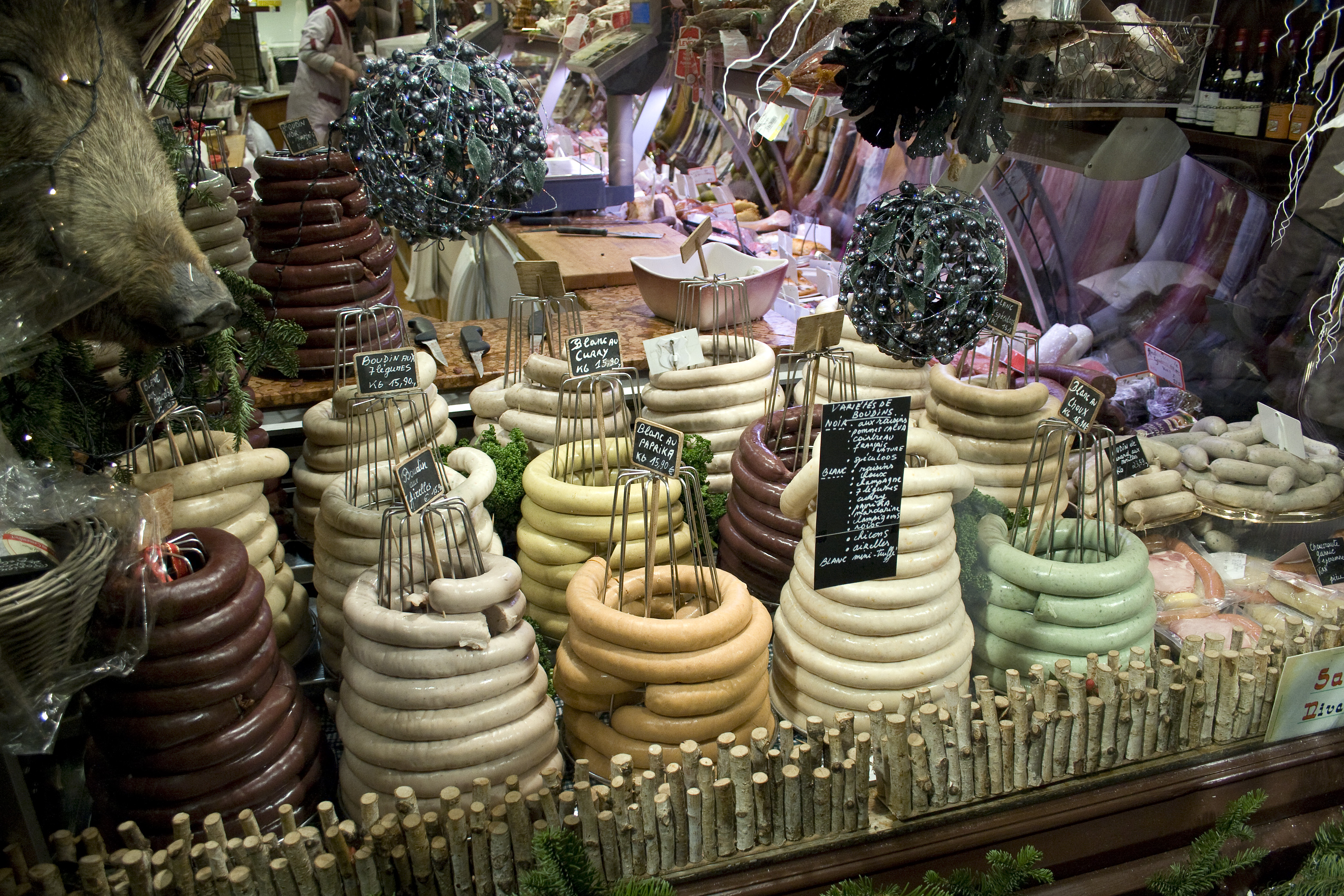
Varieties of coiled boudin/pens (blood sausage) for sale at a Belgian Christmas market

- Moules-frites/Mosselen met friet: mussels cooked or steamed with onions and celery served with Belgian fries. The recipe has often been referred to as the country's national dish, but is also popular in the neighboring Nord region of France.
- Carbonade flamande/Vlaamse karbonaden/stoofvlees/stoverij: a Belgian beef stew, similar to the French beef bourguignon, but made with Belgian beer instead of red wine. It is typically served with bread or fries and mustard, and usually accompanied by a beer. This is also considered one of the national dishes, along with moules-frites.
- Steak-frites/Biefstuk met friet: a very common and popular dish served in brasseries throughout Europe, consisting of steak paired with fries.
- Waterzooi: a rich stew and soup of chicken or fish, vegetables, cream, and eggs, usually associated with Ghent.
- Chicons au gratin/Gegratineerd witloof: Belgian endives au gratin in béchamel sauce with cheese. The endives are often wrapped with ham.
- Kip met frieten en appelmoes/Poulet avec des frites et compote: dish consisting of chicken, fries, and compote, which is very common in and around Brussels.
- Konijn in geuze/Lapin à la gueuze: rabbit in gueuze, which is a spontaneously fermented Belgian beer from the area in and around Brussels.
- Filet américain: very finely minced ground beef eaten raw and cold. It is spread on a sandwich or bread with and sometimes topped with a sauce, usually sauce américaine, and served with fries. When served as a dinner, it is mixed with onions and capers like steak tartare, but it retains the name américain. The Martino sandwich is a type of filet américain sandwich.
- Paling in 't groen/Anguilles au vert: eel in a green sauce of mixed herbs (including chervil and parsley). It is typically served with bread or fries, and usually accompanied by a beer or (sometimes) an Alsace wine.
- Pêche au thon/Perzik met tonijn: halved canned or fresh peaches stuffed with a mix of tuna and mayonnaise, i.e. tuna salad.
- Boudin/Pens: a type of sausage in which the meat, or blood, is mixed with fine breadcrumbs that is often eaten with potatoes and apple sauce, sometimes eaten raw or barbecued.
- Stoemp: a potato that is mashed with vegetables (usually carrots or cabbages), often served with sausages.
- Vol-au-vent: a small hollow case of puff pastry filled with chicken, mushrooms, small meatballs cooked in a white sauce, and typically served with fries.
- Boulets à la Liégeoise/Luikse balletjes: two big meatballs in a sweet and sour sauce called sauce lapin, served with fries.
- Lokerse paardenworst: minced horse sausages with peeled tomatoes, onion, celery, herbs, originally from Lokeren

=== Sweet dishes and desserts ===
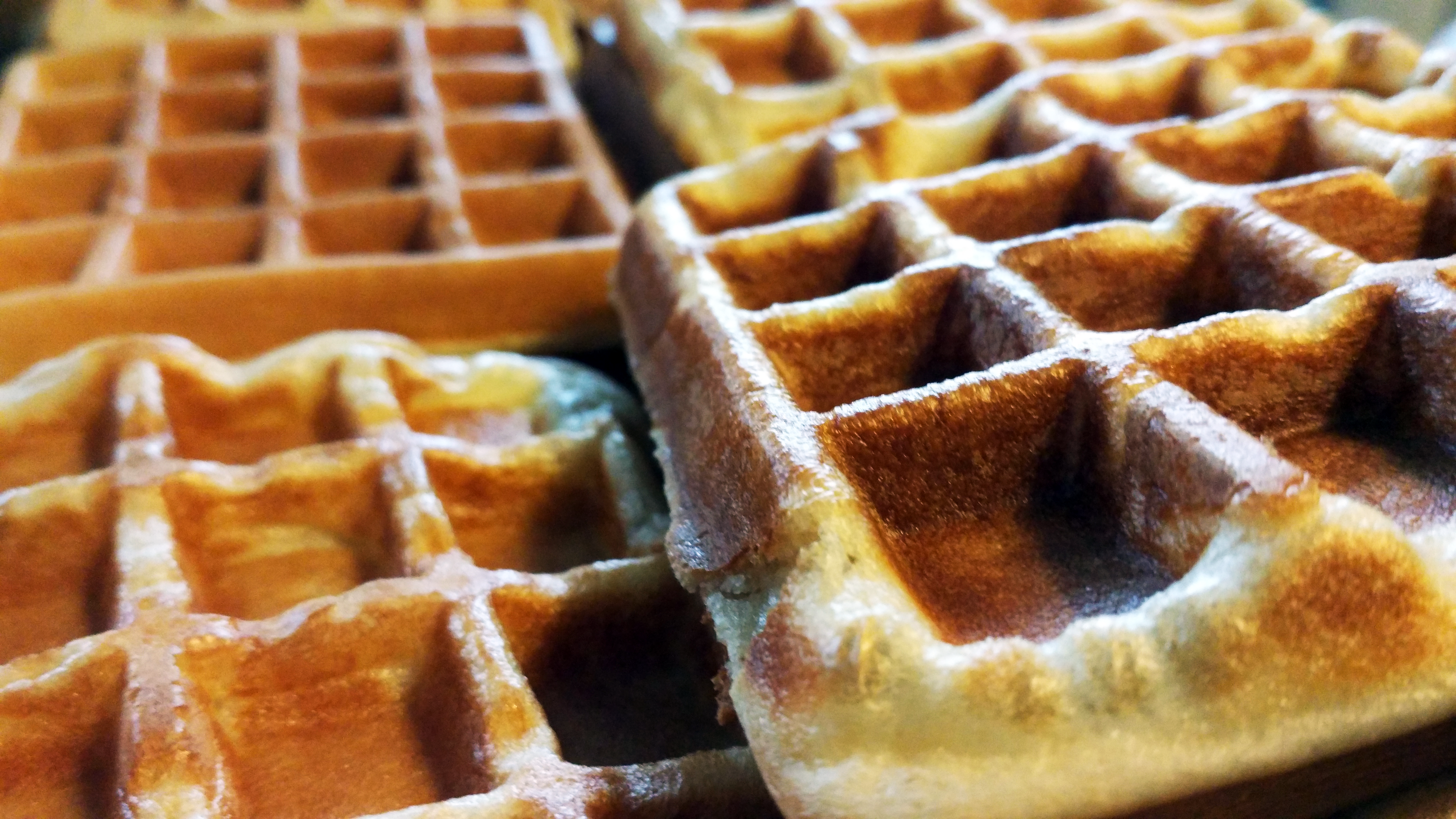
Gaufres/Wafels

- Gaufres/Wafels: Belgian waffles, sometimes eaten as a street snack and sold by ice-cream vans. Among the better-known styles are the Gaufre de Liège or Liège waffle, Brussels waffle, and the stroopwafel.
- Speculoos: a shortcrust cinnamon biscuit, traditionally baked for consumption on or just before Saint Nicholas Day (Dutch: Sinterklaas, French: la Saint-Nicolas) on 6 December.
- Croustillons/Smoutebollen: deep-fried balls of dough, eaten at fairgrounds or on special occasions like the October fair.
- Rijstevlaai/Tarte au riz: a pie with a filling based on rice pudding, native to Verviers.
- Sirop de Liège/Luikse siroop: a jam or jelly-like spread made of evaporated fruit juices.
- Babelutte: a sort of long toffee flavoured with honey or vergeoise (demerara sugar). The candy is closely related to Butterscotch.
- Cuberdon: a cone-shaped purple candy made of gum arabic, originally from Ghent.
- Cougnou or bread of Jesus: a sweet bread formed like a baby Jesus, baked during Christmas time.
- Dame blanche: vanilla ice cream topped with melted chocolate and whipped cream.
- Lacquements: thin wafer, made from wheat, cut in two horizontally, filled and coated with sugar candy syrup flavoured with orange blossom. Generally eaten during the October fair in Liège and the Sinksenfoor in Antwerp.
- Aalsterse vlaai: a regional pie from Aalst, with well-known variations in the surrounding area, such as Wetteren (Wetterse vlaai) and Kalken (Kalkense vlaai). A key ingredient is mastellen, a type of sandwich local to Aalst.

== Belgian fries ==
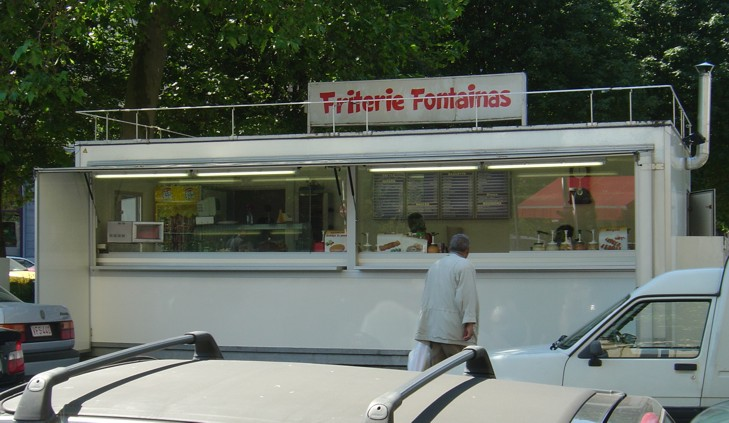
A typical friterie or fritkot in Belgium

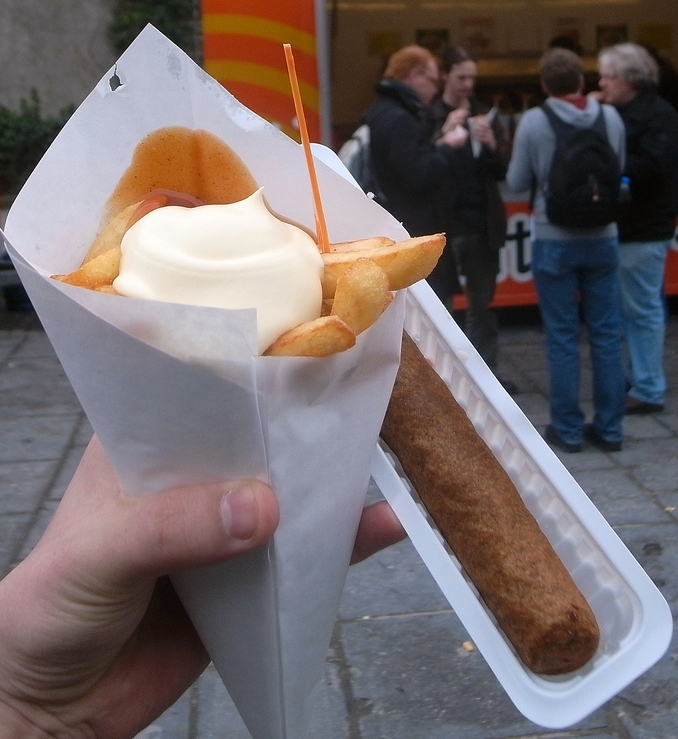
Frites wrapped in a traditional paper cone (cornet) served with mayonnaise and curry ketchup, with a small plastic fork on top and a meat frikandel on the side

Fries, deep-fried chipped potatoes, are very popular in Belgium, where they are thought to have originated. The earliest evidence of the dish comes from a book entitled Curiosités de la table dans les Pays-Bas-Belgiques written in 1781, which described how inhabitants of Namur, Dinant and Andenne around the river Meuse had eaten fried potatoes since around 1680. Though they are usually known as "French fries" in the United States, it is argued that American soldiers during the First World War called them "French fries" because the Belgian soldiers who introduced them to the dish spoke French.

In Belgium, fries are sold at independent fast-food stands or in dedicated fast-food restaurants called friteries, frietkot, or frituur (loosely: “fry shack”). They are often served with a variety of sauces and eaten either on their own or in the company of other snacks. Traditionally, they are served in a cornet de frites (French) or puntzak (Flemish), a cone-shaped white piece of thick paper then wrapped in a piece of thin (and coloured) paper, with the sauce on the top. Larger portions are often served in cardboard trays for practicality's sake. Other street foods like frikandel, gehaktbal or kroket are sold alongside. In some cases, the fries are served in the form of a baguette sandwich along with their sauce and meat; this is known as a mitraillette. In areas with immigration, the same combination is also available in a wrap called a dürüm instead of on a baguette.

The vast majority of Belgian households have a deep fryer, allowing them to make their own fries and other deep-fried foods at home. Supermarkets sell a range of liquid and solid animal- and plant-based fats for use in home deep fryers; beef fat is particularly prized.

Belgian fries are distinct, as they are fried twice, leading to a crispy bite. However, in June 2017, the European Commission issued a recommendation to limit the chemical acrylamide—a natural result of frying some foods at high temperatures—from reaching consumers, due to its alleged carcinogenic properties. The document proposed a change in the preparation of Belgian fries to prevent the formation of acrylamide, by blanching them before frying, as opposed to the traditional method of double frying. This led to a wave of protests from several Belgian politicians, who viewed it as an assault on the country's culture and gastronomical tradition.

=== Sauces ===
Traditionally, fries are usually served with mayonnaise in Belgium. Friteries and other fast-food establishments tend to offer a number of different sauces for the fries and meats, including homemade Tartar sauce sauce américaine but also much more elaborate varieties, including béarnaise sauce. There are frequently over a dozen options, and most of them are mayonnaise-based, so the varieties include:

- Aïoli/Looksaus: garlic mayonnaise.
- Algérienne sauce: mayonnaise with mustard, shallot, black pepper, vinegar, and chili pepper or harissa, and sometimes also tomato or tomato sauce, anchovies, or capers.
- Sauce américaine: mayonnaise with tomato, chervil, onions, capers, crustacean stock, and celery.
- Sauce andalouse: mayonnaise with tomato paste and peppers.
- Bicky sauce: a commercial brand made from mayonnaise, white cabbage, tarragon, dough, cucumber, onion, mustard, and dextrose.
- Brazilian sauce: mayonnaise with pureed pineapple, tomato, and spices.
- Cocktail sauce: one of several types of cold or room temperature sauces often served as part of the dish(es) referred to as a seafood cocktail or as a condiment with other seafood.
- Curry ketchup: a spiced variant on ketchup and a common sauce in Belgium, Germany, Denmark, and the Netherlands.
- Curry mayonnaise: mayonnaise with either turmeric, cumin, ginger, and fresh or dried hot chili peppers.
- Joppiesaus: a commercial brand made from mayonnaise, spices, onion, and curry powder.
- Ketchup: a sweet and tangy sauce typically made from tomatoes, sweetener, and vinegar with assorted seasonings and spices.
- Mammoet sauce: mayonnaise with tomato, onion, glucose, garlic, and soy sauce.
- Mayonnaise: a thick cold sauce or dressing usually used in sandwiches and composed salads.
- Pepper sauce: mayonnaise or hot sauce with black pepper.
- Relish—a cooked and pickled product made of chopped vegetables, fruits, or herbs, and is a food item typically used as a condiment, in particular, to enhance a staple.
- Sauce lapin: a sauce made from sirop de Liège, cooked with raisins, onions, prunes, and cloves, typically served with boulets à la Liégeoise.
- Sauce riche: a pink, tartar-based sauce.
- Samurai sauce: mayonnaise with Tunisian chili, spices, tomatoes, and bell peppers.
- Tartar sauce: a mayonnaise or aïoli-based sauce of French origin, and is typical of a rough consistency due to the addition of diced gherkins or other varieties of pickles.
- Zigeuner sauce: a "gypsy" sauce of tomatoes, paprika, and chopped bell peppers, borrowed from Germany.

Occasionally, warm sauces are offered by friteries, including Hollandaise sauce, Provençale sauce, béarnaise sauce, (and most prevalent) carbonade flamande. Most of the sauces above are also readily available in supermarkets. The use of these sauces is not limited to fries; they are used on a variety of other dishes as well.

== Beer ==
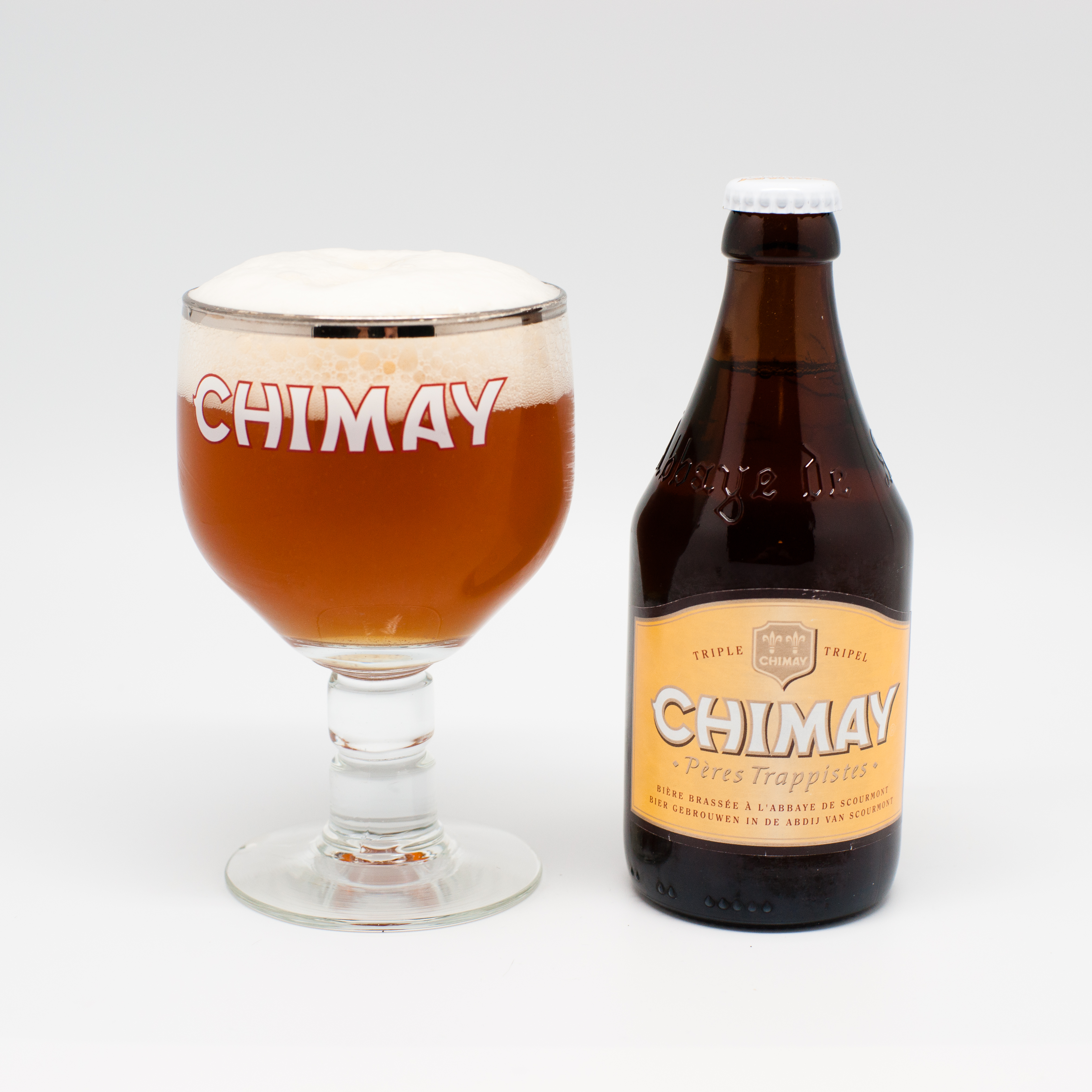
Chimay Tripel, a Trappist beer with its own glass

For a comparatively small country, Belgium produces a very large number of beers in a range of different styles—in fact, it has more distinct types of beer per capita than anywhere else in the world. In 2011, there were 1,132 different varieties of beer being produced in the country. The brewing tradition in Belgium can be traced back to the early Middle Ages and six Trappist monasteries still produce beer, which was initially used to fund their upkeep.

On average, Belgians drink 157 litres of beer each year, down from around 260 each year in 1900. Most beers are bought or served in bottles, rather than cans, and almost every style of beer has its own particular, uniquely shaped glass or other drinking vessel. Using the correct glass is considered to improve the beer's flavour.

The varied nature of Belgian beers makes it possible to match them against each course of a meal. For instance:

- Wheat beer with seafood or fish
- Blonde or Tripel beers with eel, chicken or white meat
- Dubbel or other dark beers with dark meat
- Fruit lambics with dessert

A number of traditional Belgian dishes use beer as an ingredient. One is carbonade, a stew of beef cooked in beer, similar to beef bourguignon. The beer used is typically the regional speciality—lambic in Brussels, De Koninck in Antwerp—so that the taste of the dish varies. Another is rabbit in gueuze. The Trappist monastery at Chimay also manufactures cheese that is "washed" with beer to enhance its flavour.

== Jenever ==
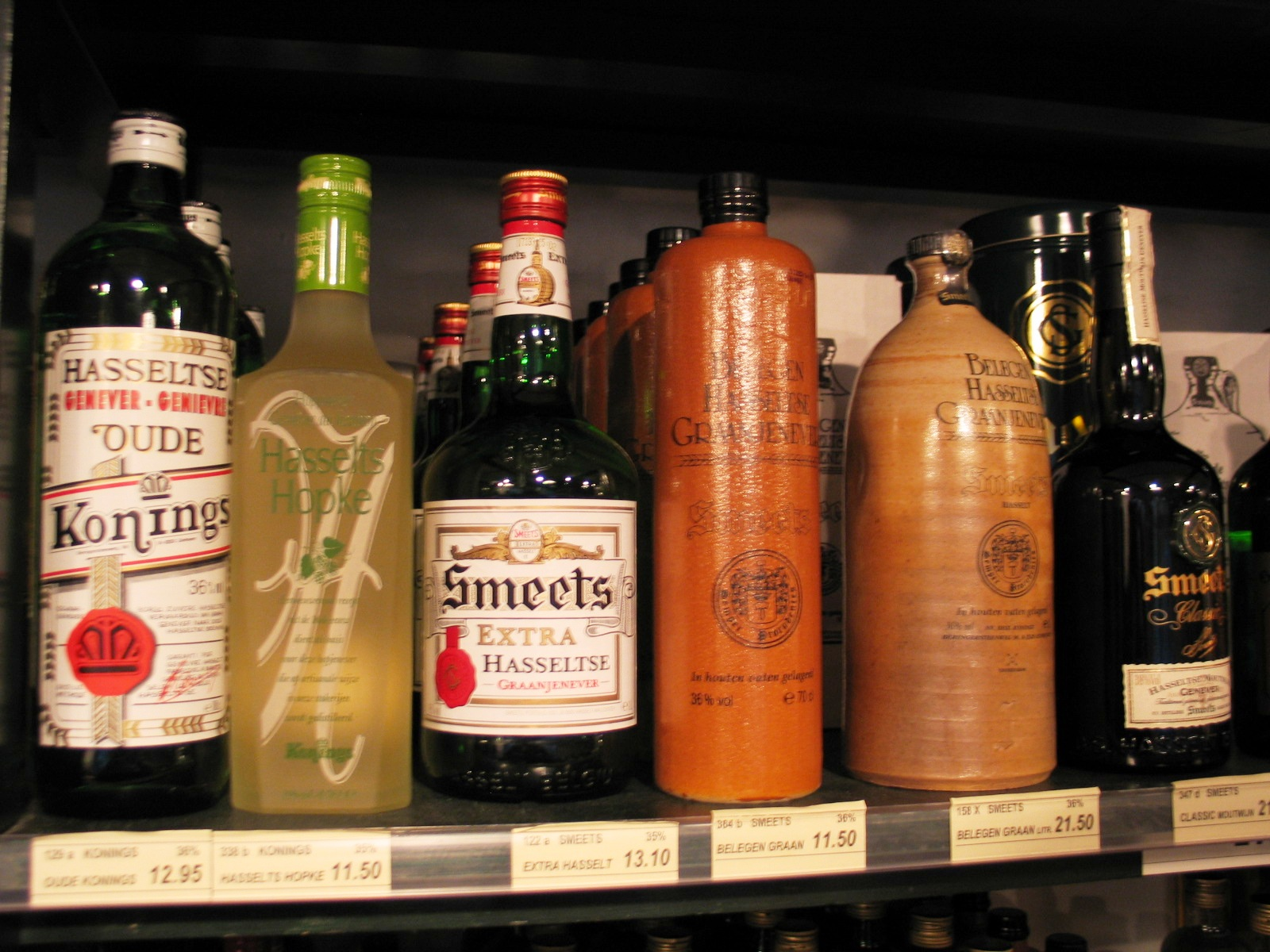
Jenever bottles for sale in Hasselt, including two in traditional clay bottles

Jenever, also known as genièvre, genever, peket or Dutch gin, is the national spirit of Belgium from which gin evolved. While beer may be Belgium's most famous alcoholic beverage, jenever has been the country's traditional and national spirit for over 500 years. Jenever is a "Protected Product of Origin", having received eleven different appellations or AOCs from the European Union, and can only be produced in Belgium, the Netherlands, and a few areas in France and Germany. Most of these AOCs are exclusive to Belgium, making Belgian jenever one of the best-kept secrets in the liquor industry.

For centuries, jenever has been bottled in jugs handcrafted from clay that are moulded into an iconic shape. Traditionally, Belgians serve jenever in glasses that are completely full and have just been pulled from the freezer. In Belgian culture, the first step to drinking jenever properly is to keep the glass on the table, bend down, then take the first sip without holding the glass. Once this traditional first sip has been completed, the rest of the drink can be consumed normally.

== Chocolate ==
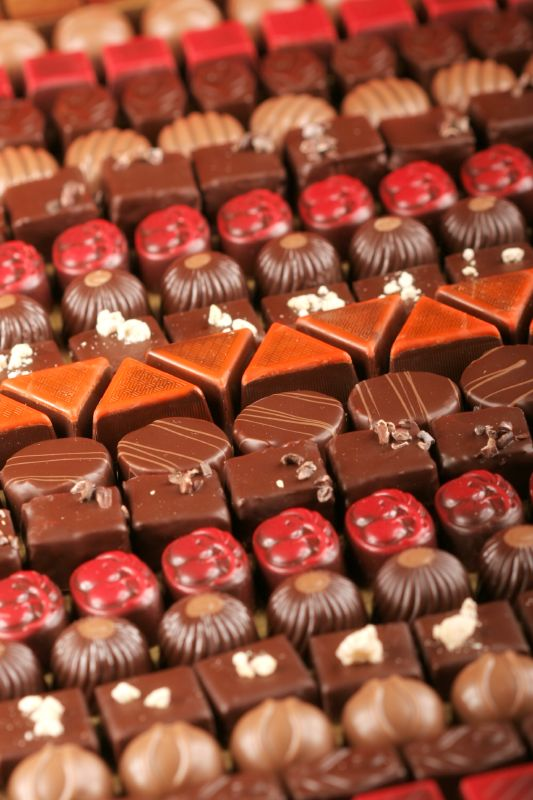
Chocolate pralines

Belgium is famed for its high quality chocolate and over 2,000 chocolatiers, both small and large. Belgium's association with chocolate goes back as far as 1635 when the country was under Spanish occupation. By the mid-18th century, chocolate had become extremely popular in upper and middle class circles, particularly in the form of hot chocolate, including with Charles-Alexander of Lorraine, the Austrian governor of the territory. From the early 20th century, the country was able to import large quantities of cocoa from its African colony, the Belgian Congo. Both the chocolate bar and praline are inventions of the Belgian chocolate industry. Today, chocolate is very popular in Belgium, with 172,000 tonnes produced each year, and widely exported.

The composition of Belgian chocolate has been regulated by law since 1884. In order to prevent adulteration of the chocolate with low-quality fats from other sources, a minimum level of 35% pure cocoa was imposed. Adherence to traditional manufacturing techniques also serves to increase the quality of Belgian chocolate. In particular, vegetable-based fats are not used. Many firms produce chocolates by hand, which is laborious and explains the prevalence of small, independent chocolate outlets, which are popular with tourists. Famous chocolate companies, like Neuhaus and Guylian, strictly follow traditional (and sometimes secret) recipes for their products.

Seafood pralines (pralines shaped like sea shells or fish) are popular with tourists and are sold all over Belgium.

Famous Belgian chocolatiers include Côte d'or, Leonidas, Guylian and Neuhaus.

== Gallery ==
=== Appetizers and light fare ===
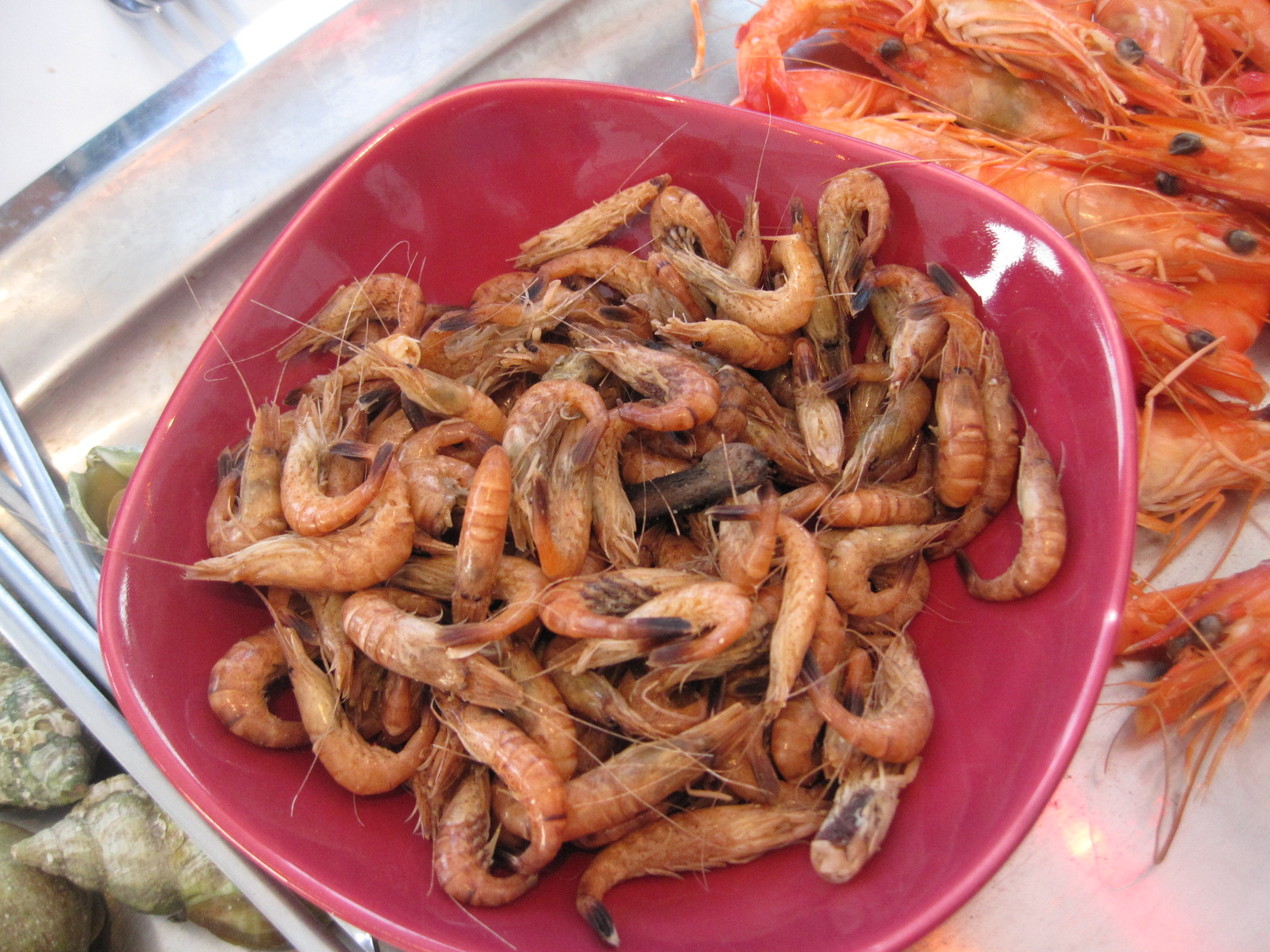
A bowl of grey shrimp as a snack

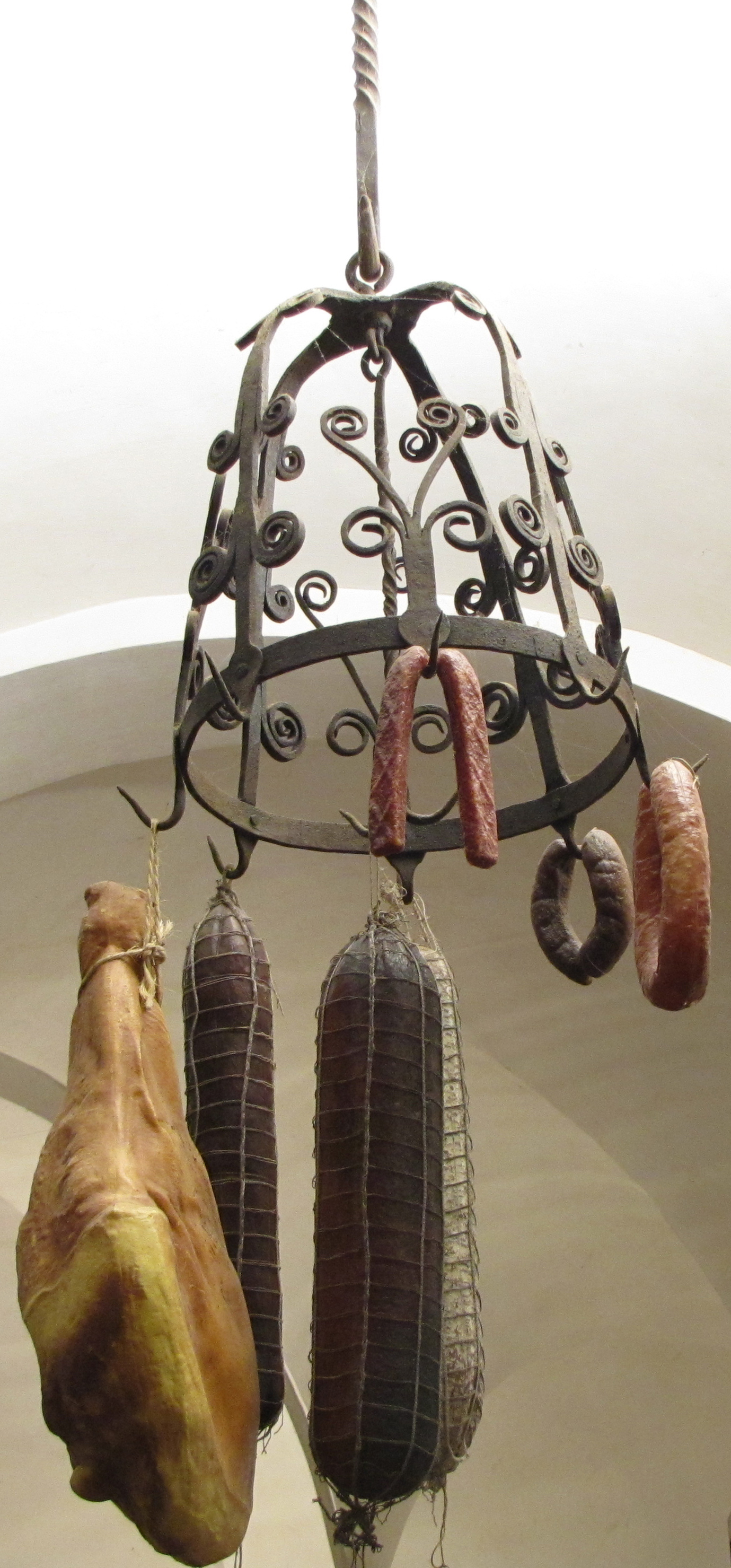
Jambon d'Ardenne/Ardeense ham hanging from a rack

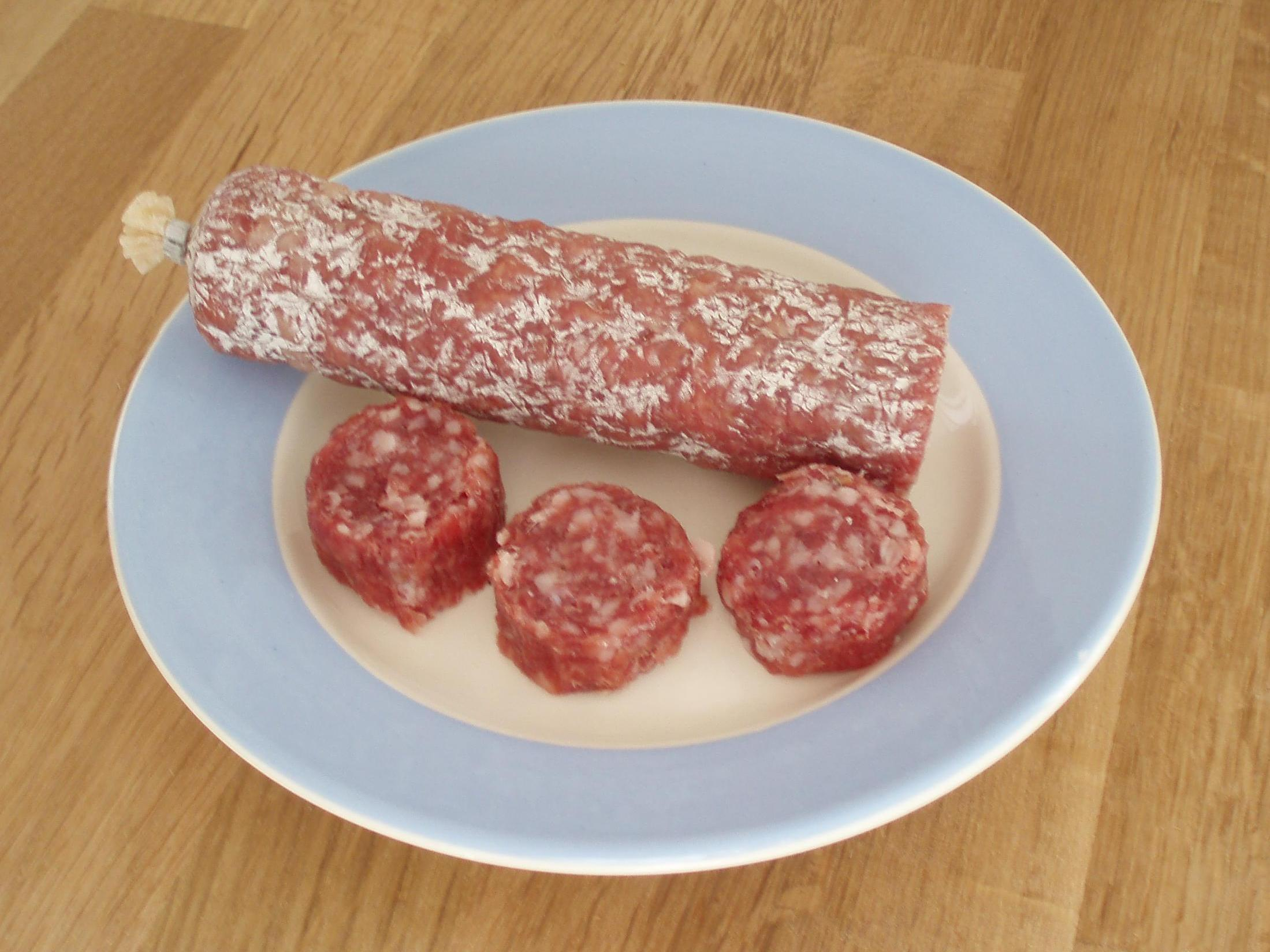
Dried Ardenne sausage

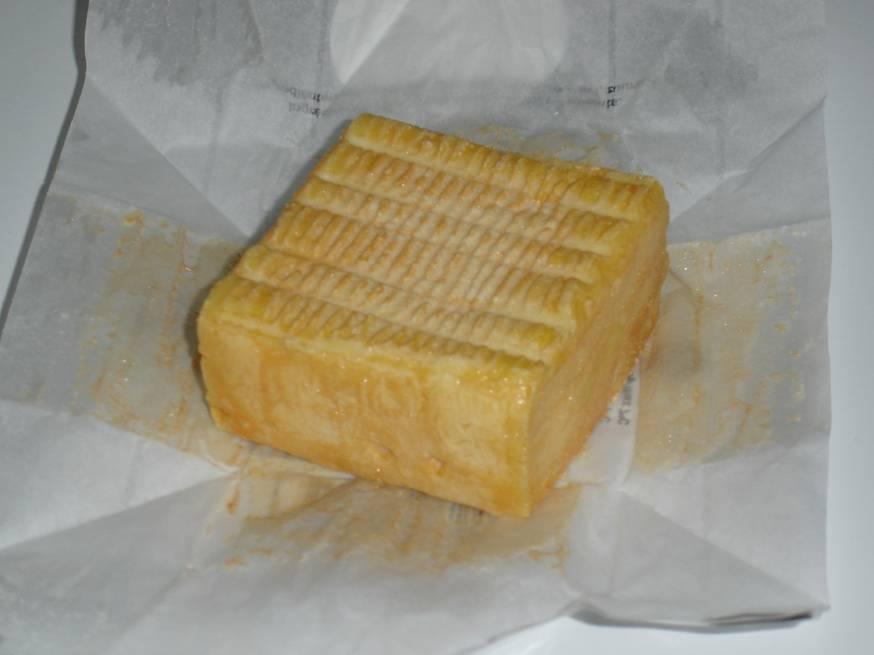
Herve cheese

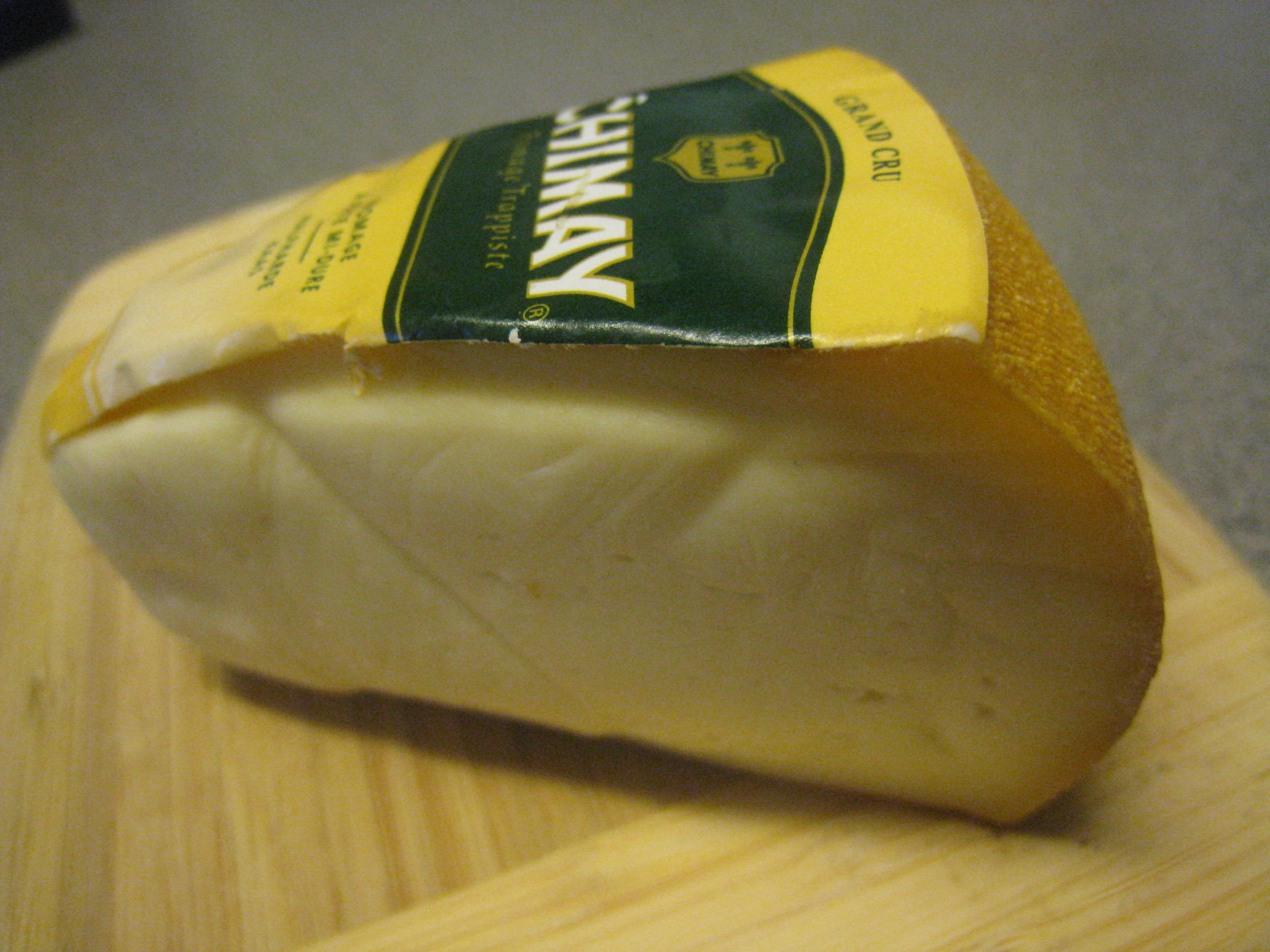
Chimay Brewery's Grand Cru cheese

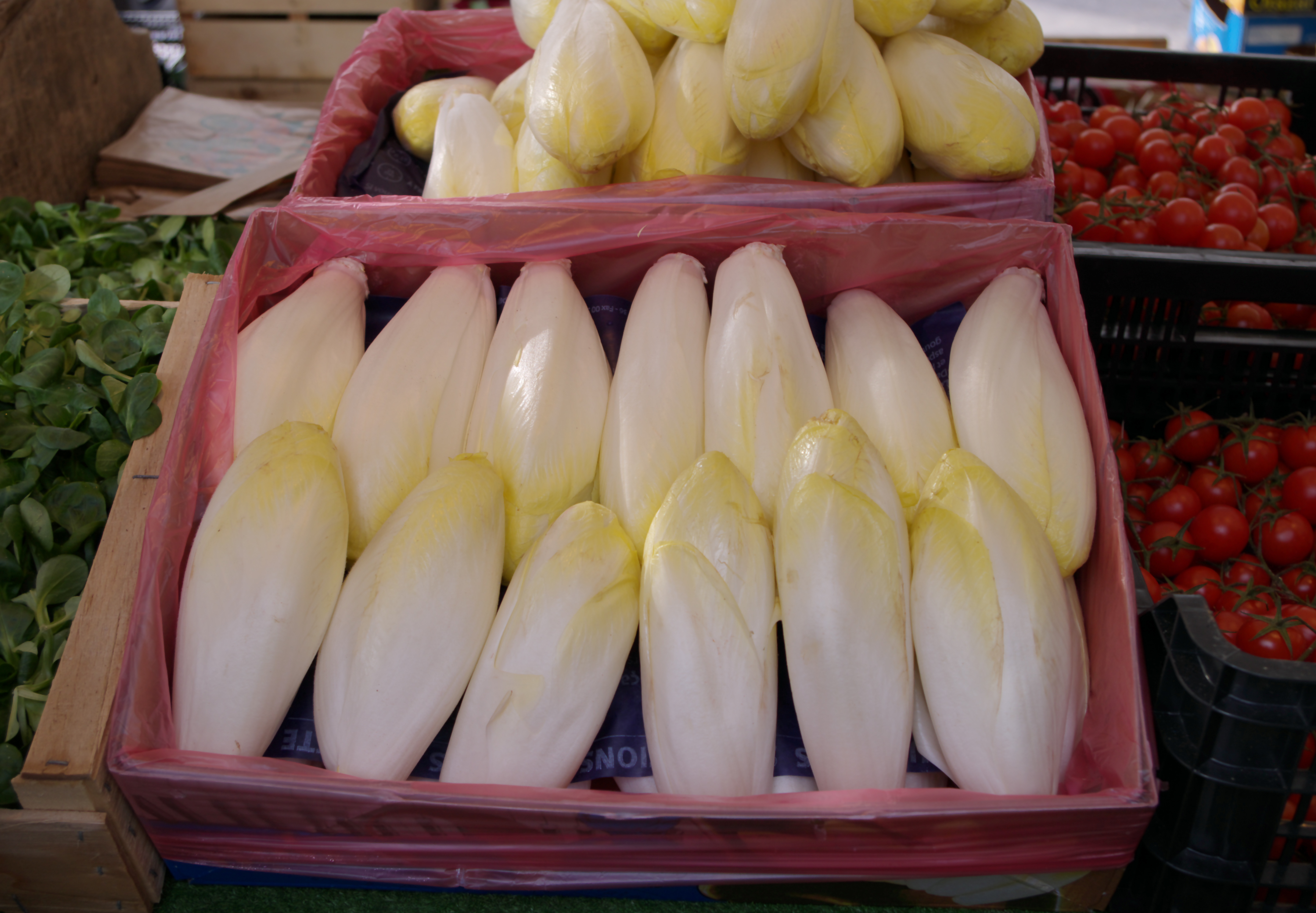
Belgian endives in a market

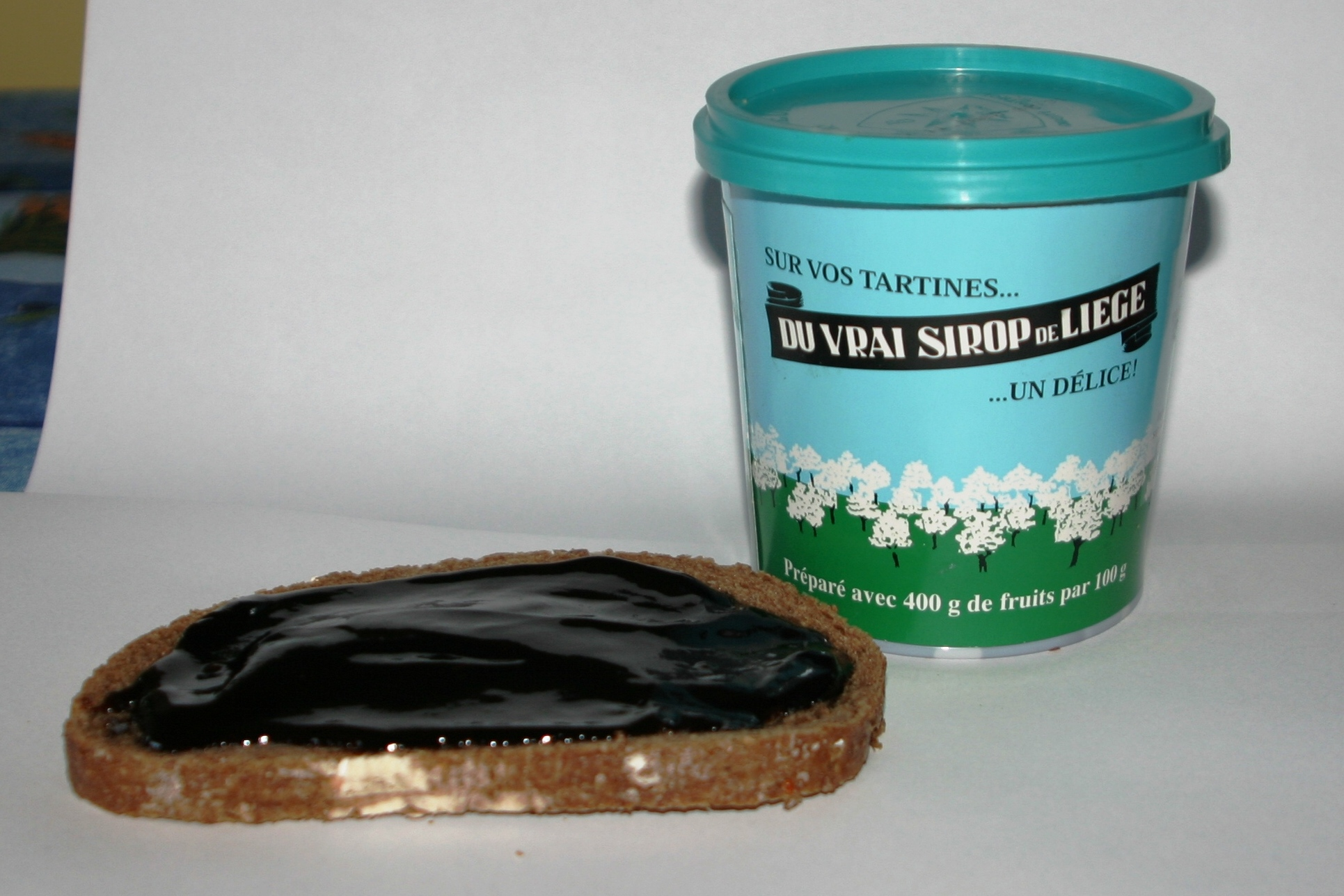
Sirop de Liège/Luikse siroop on a slice of bread

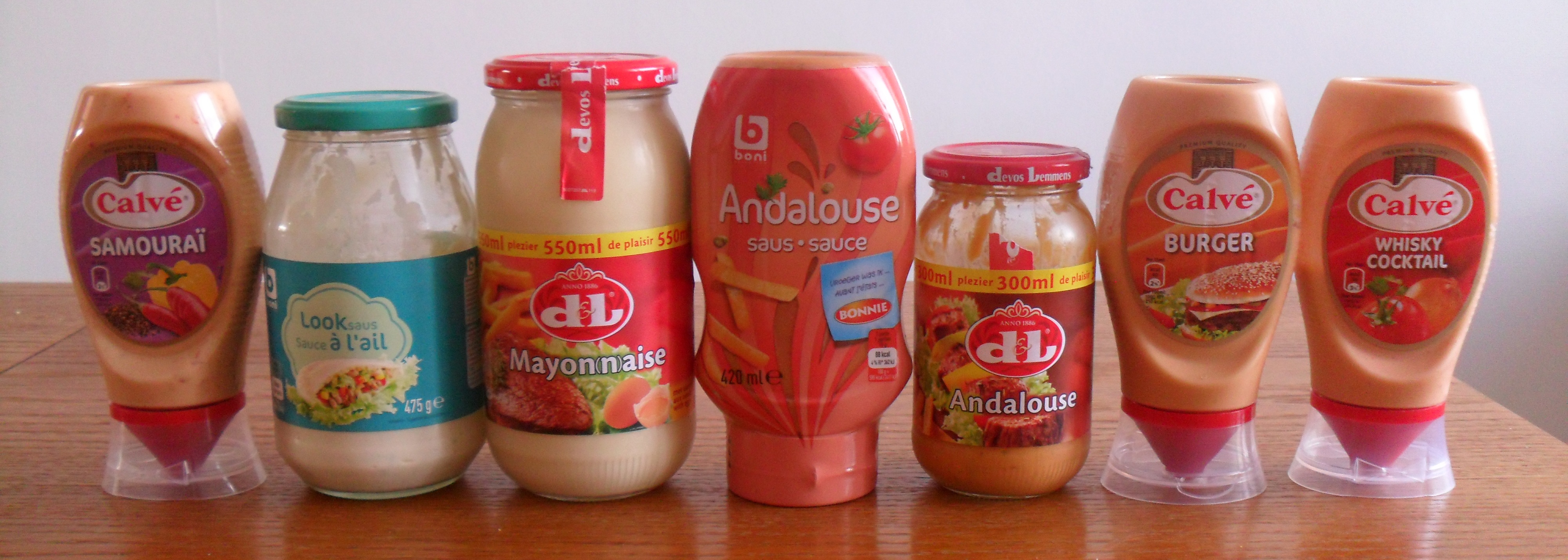
An assortment of sauces

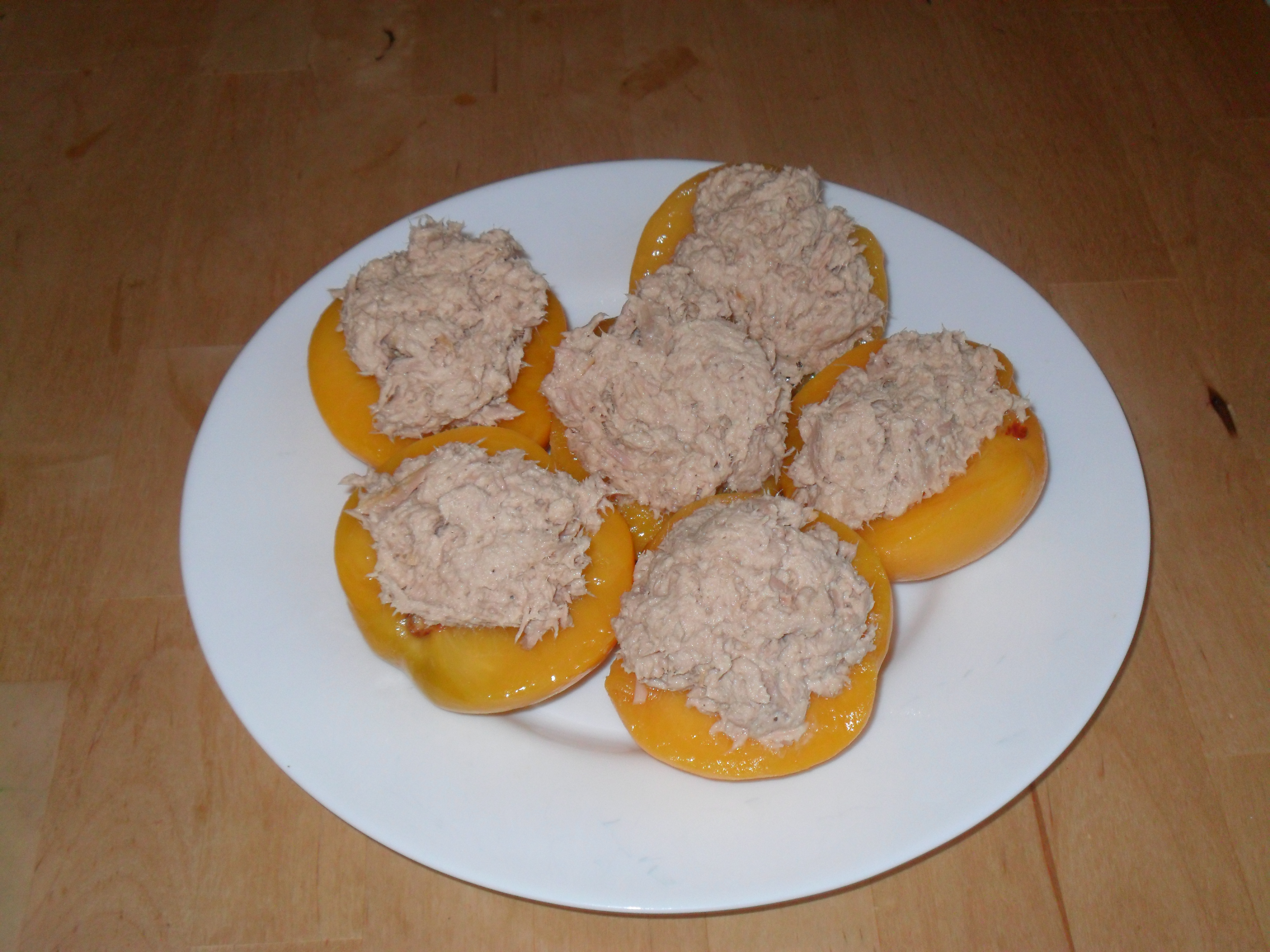
Pêches au thon/Perziken met tonijn

=== Main dishes ===
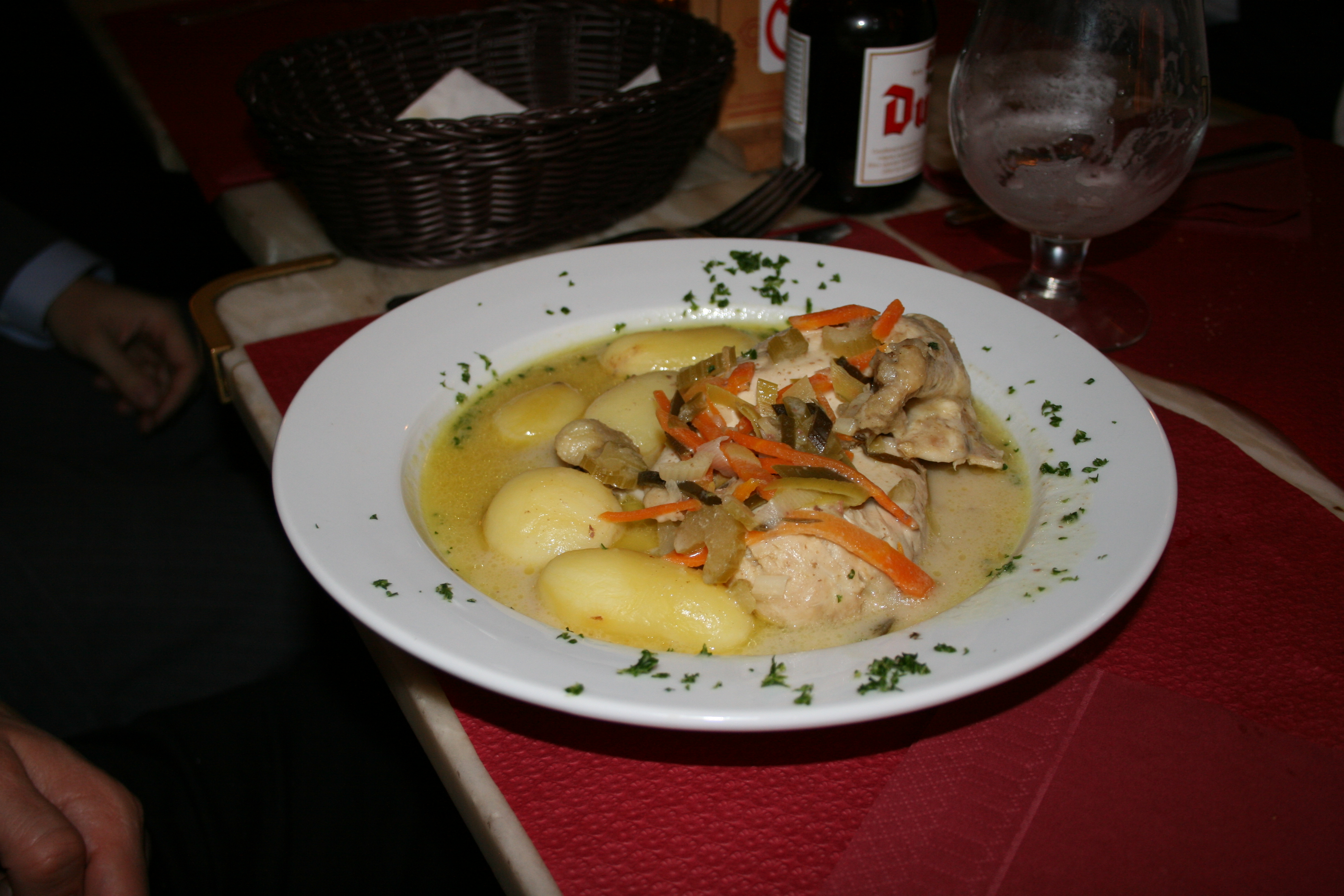
Chicken waterzooi

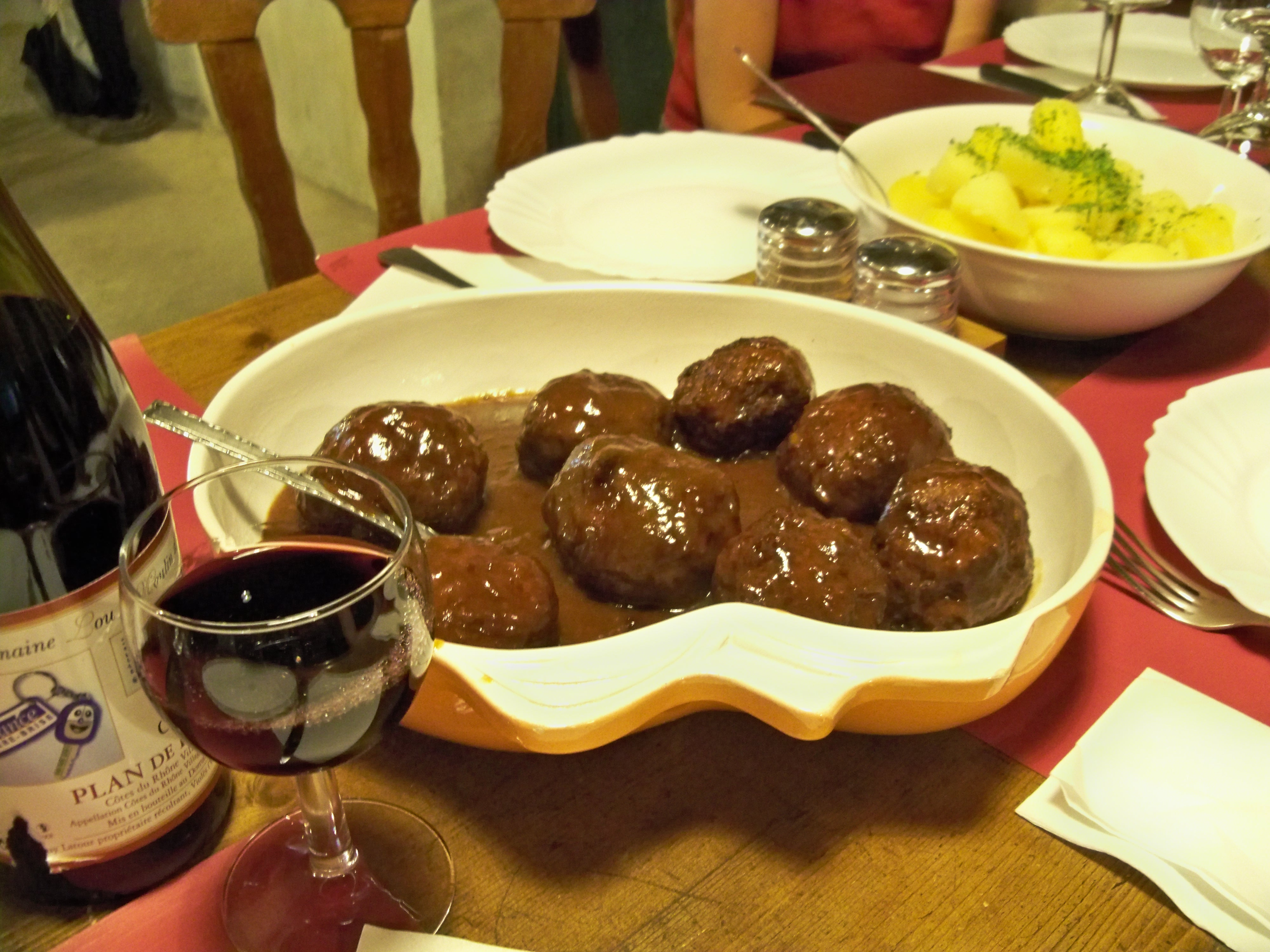
Boulets à la Liégeoise

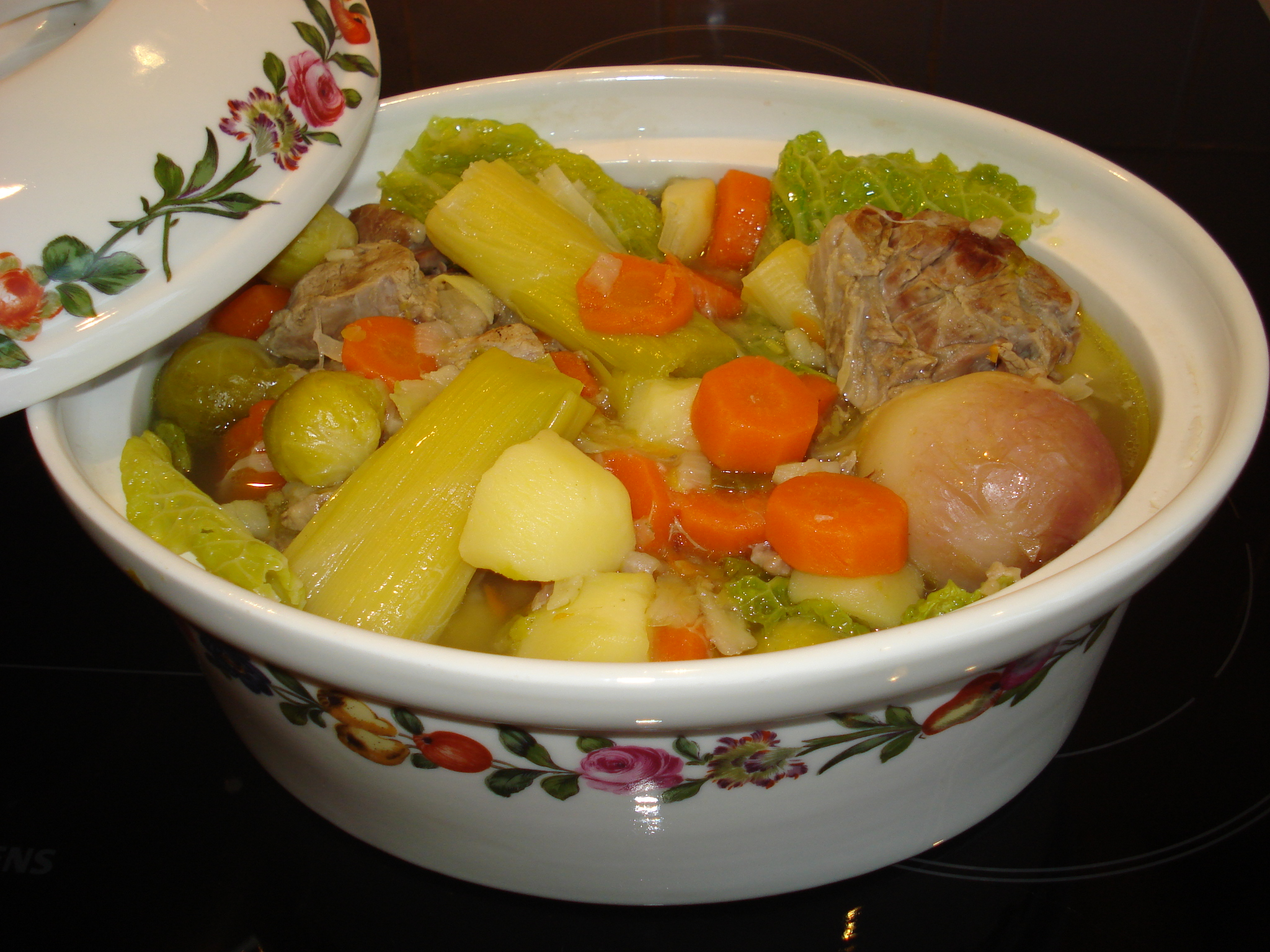
Hutsepot

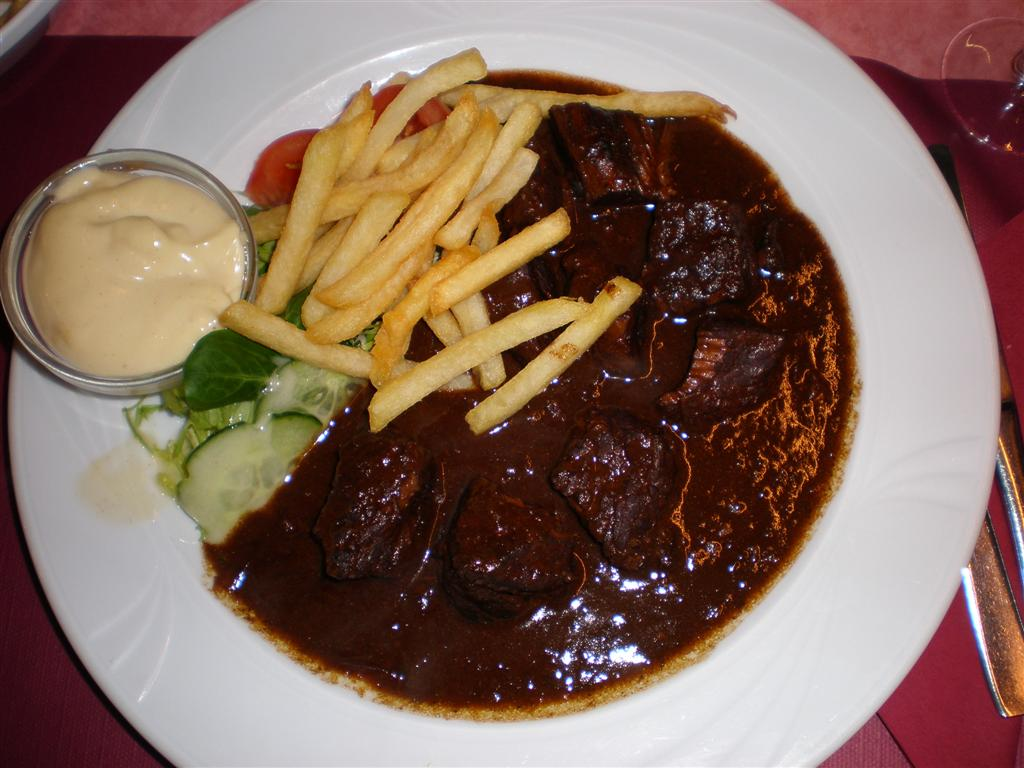
Carbonade flamande/Stoofvlees with fries and salad

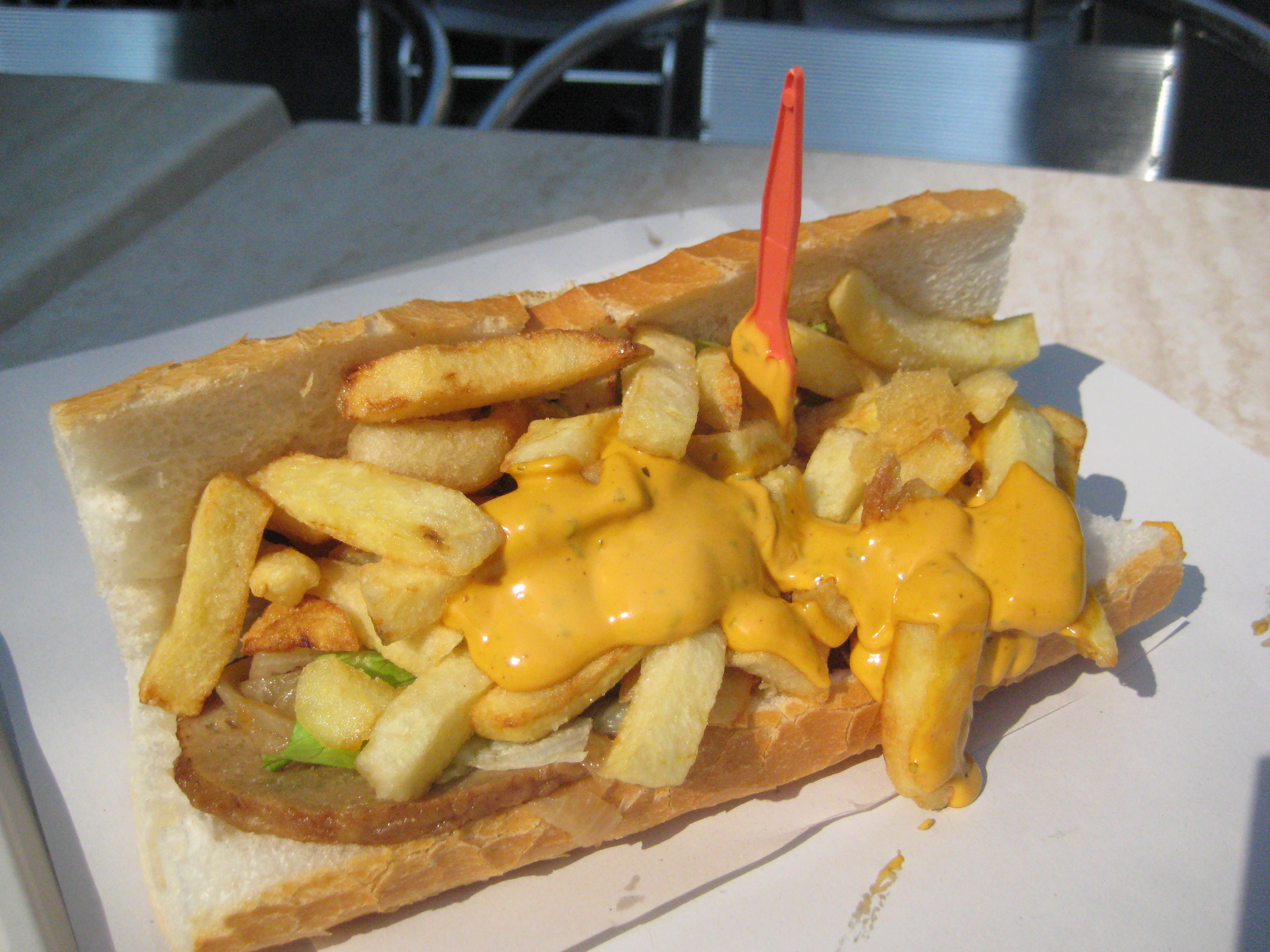
A mitraillette

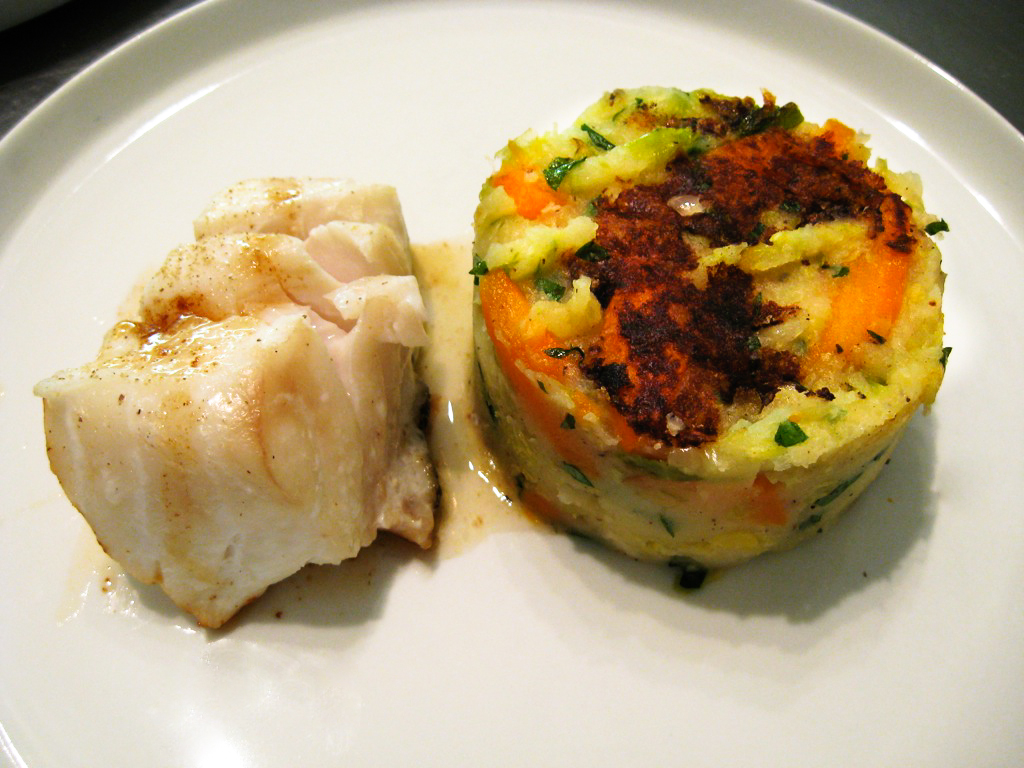
Stoemp with cod

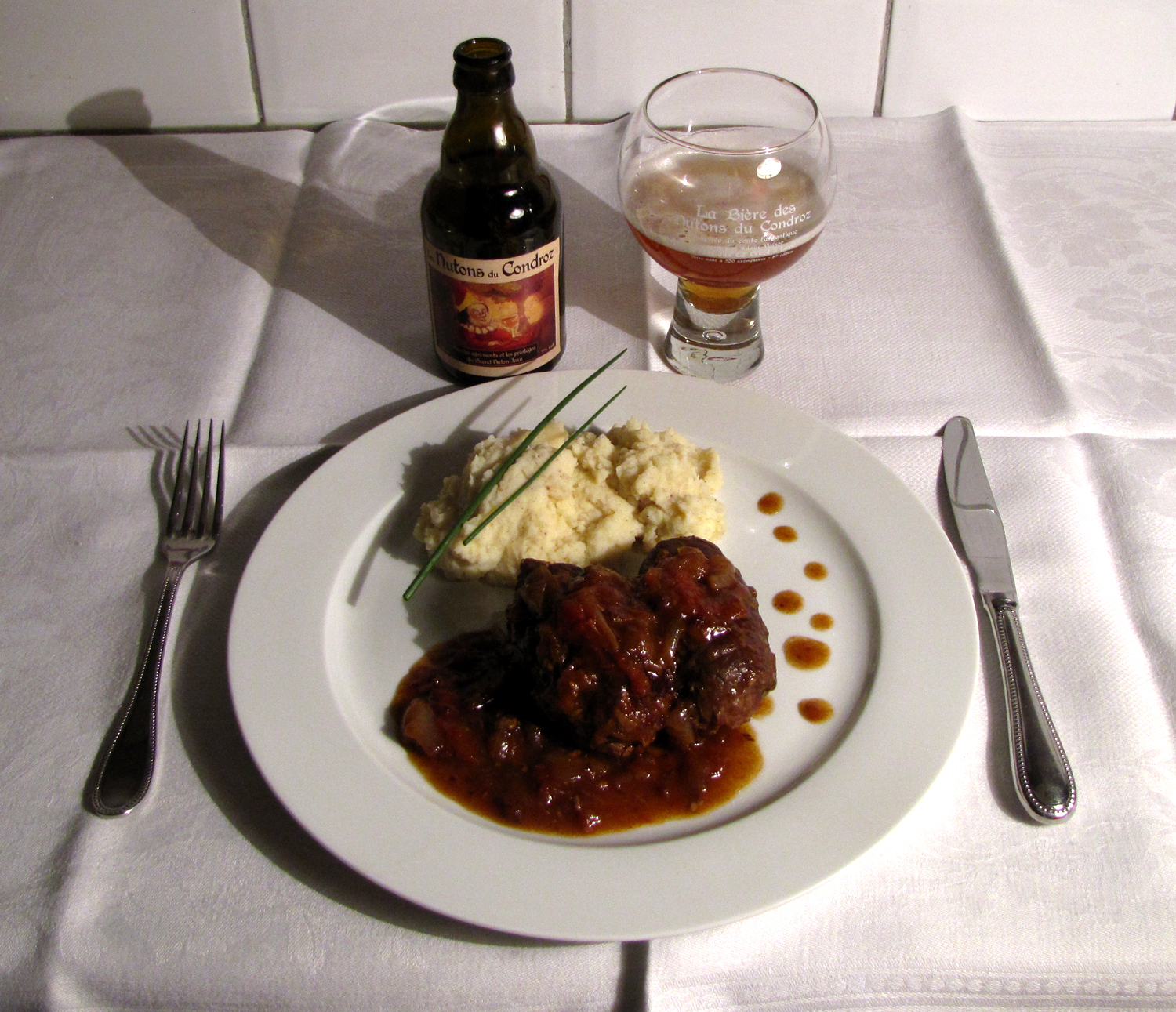
Oiseau sans tête/Blinde vink

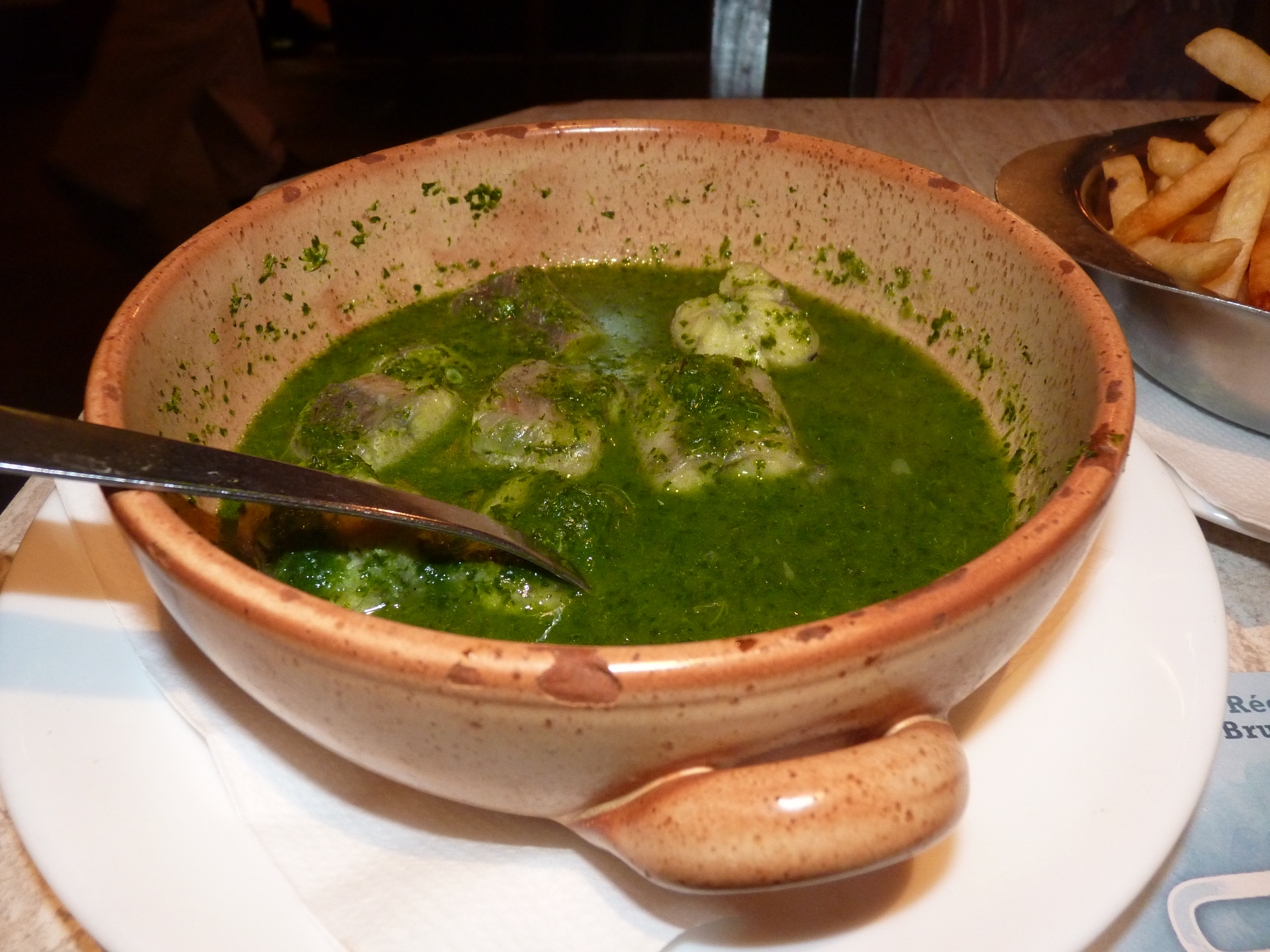
Paling in 't groen/Anguilles au vert

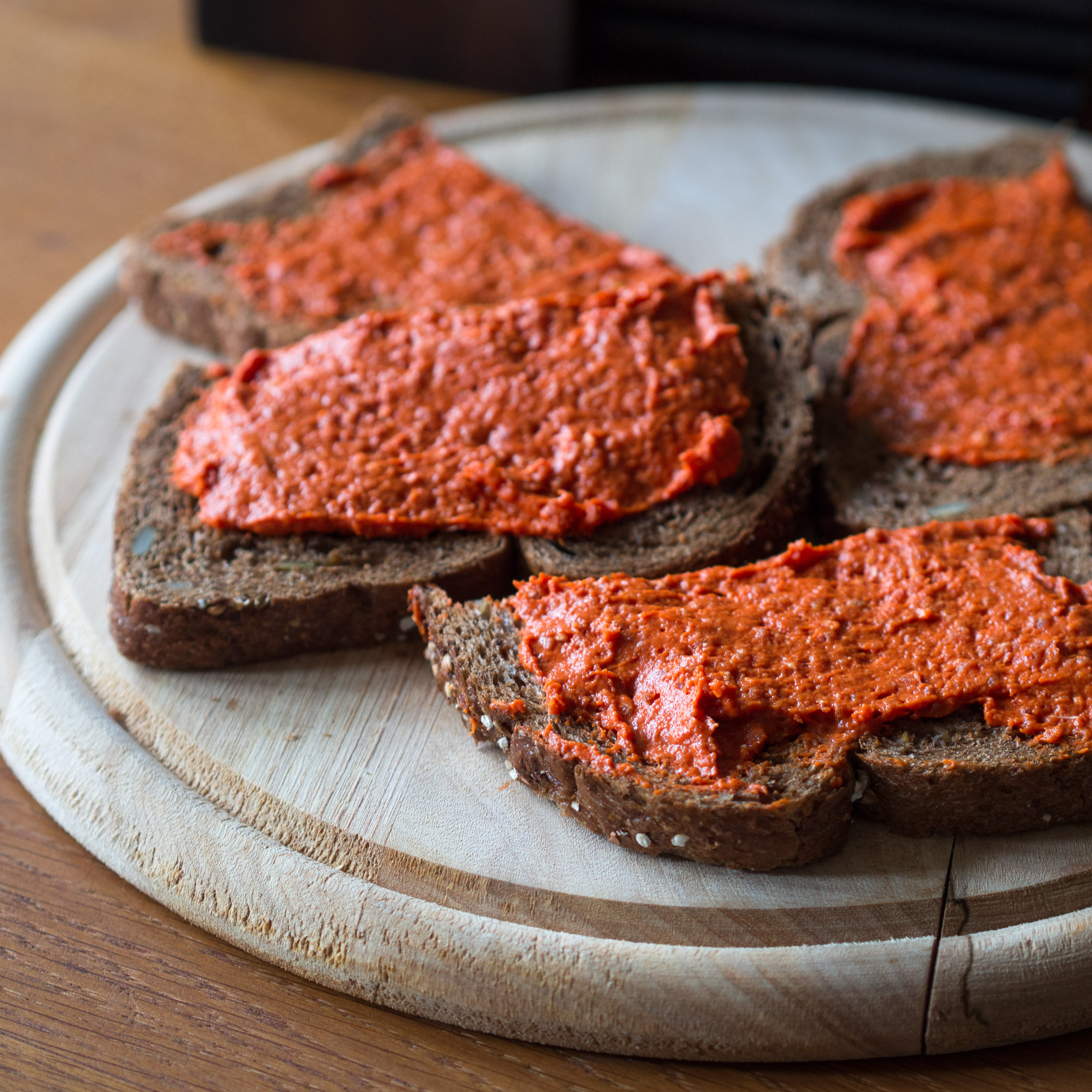
Filet américain

=== Sweet dishes and desserts ===
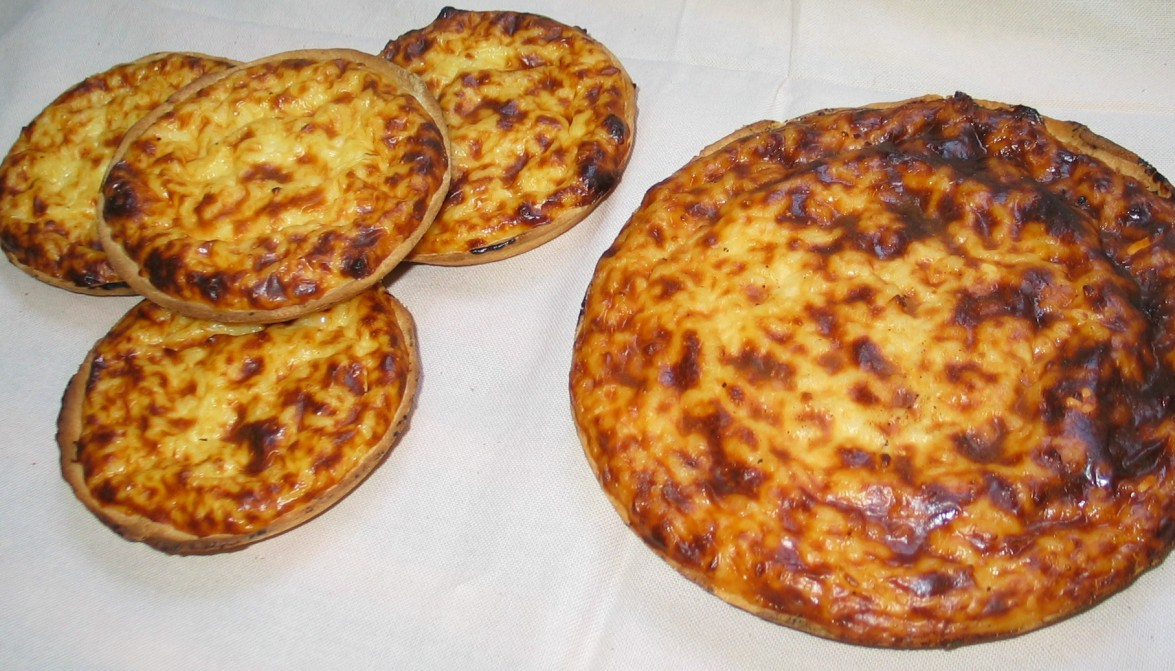
Rijstevlaai/Tarte au riz

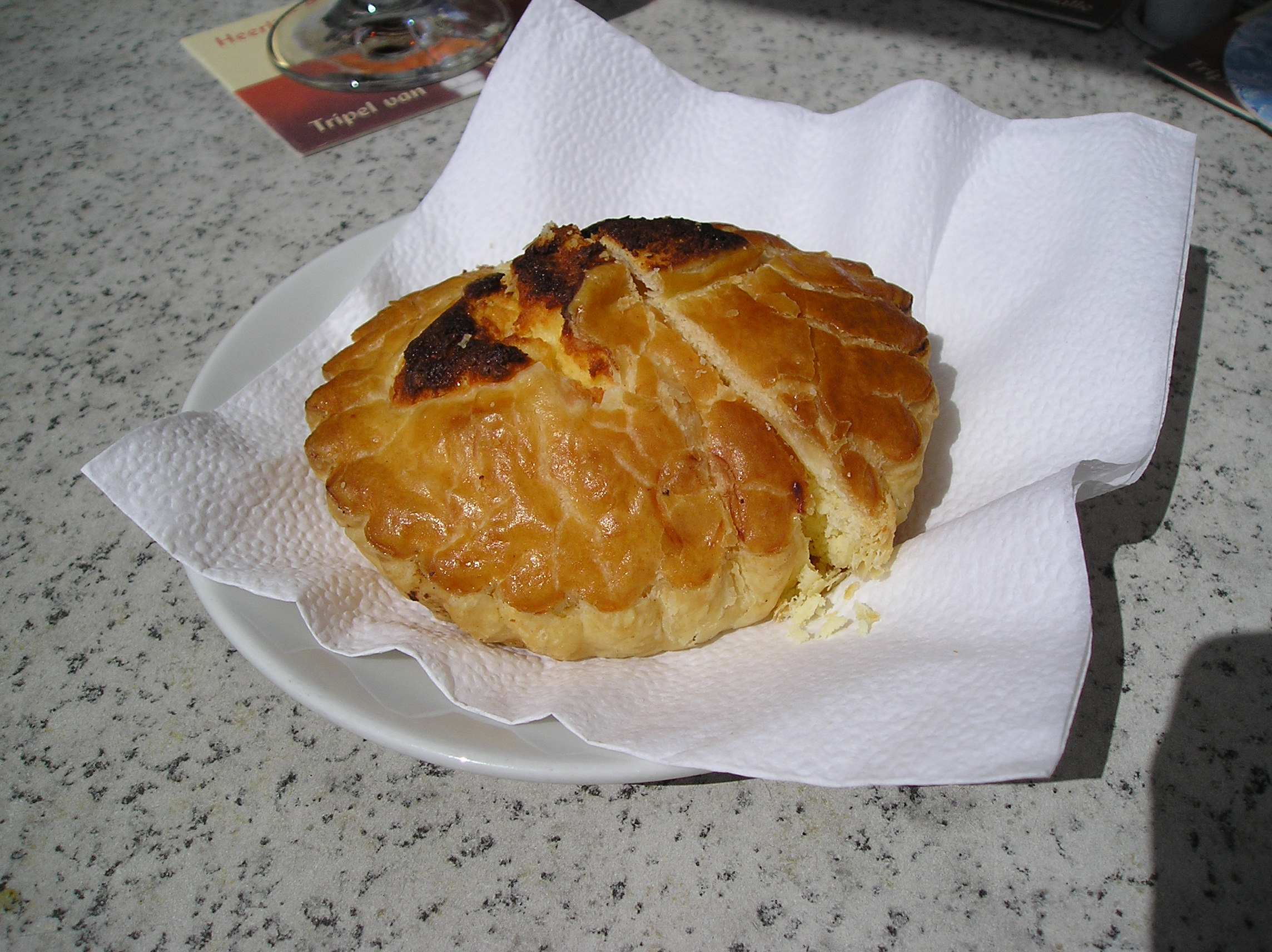
Mattentaart

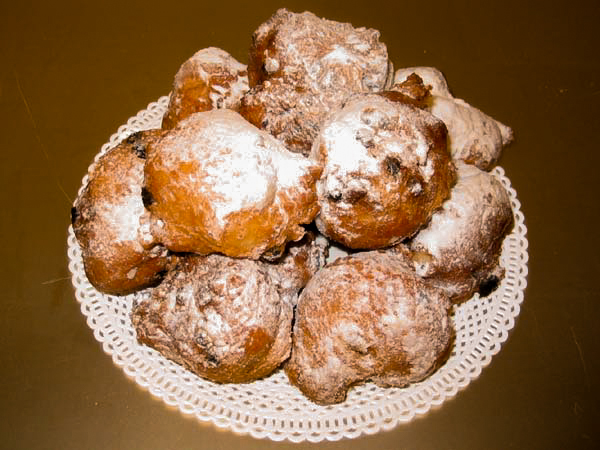
Smoutebollen

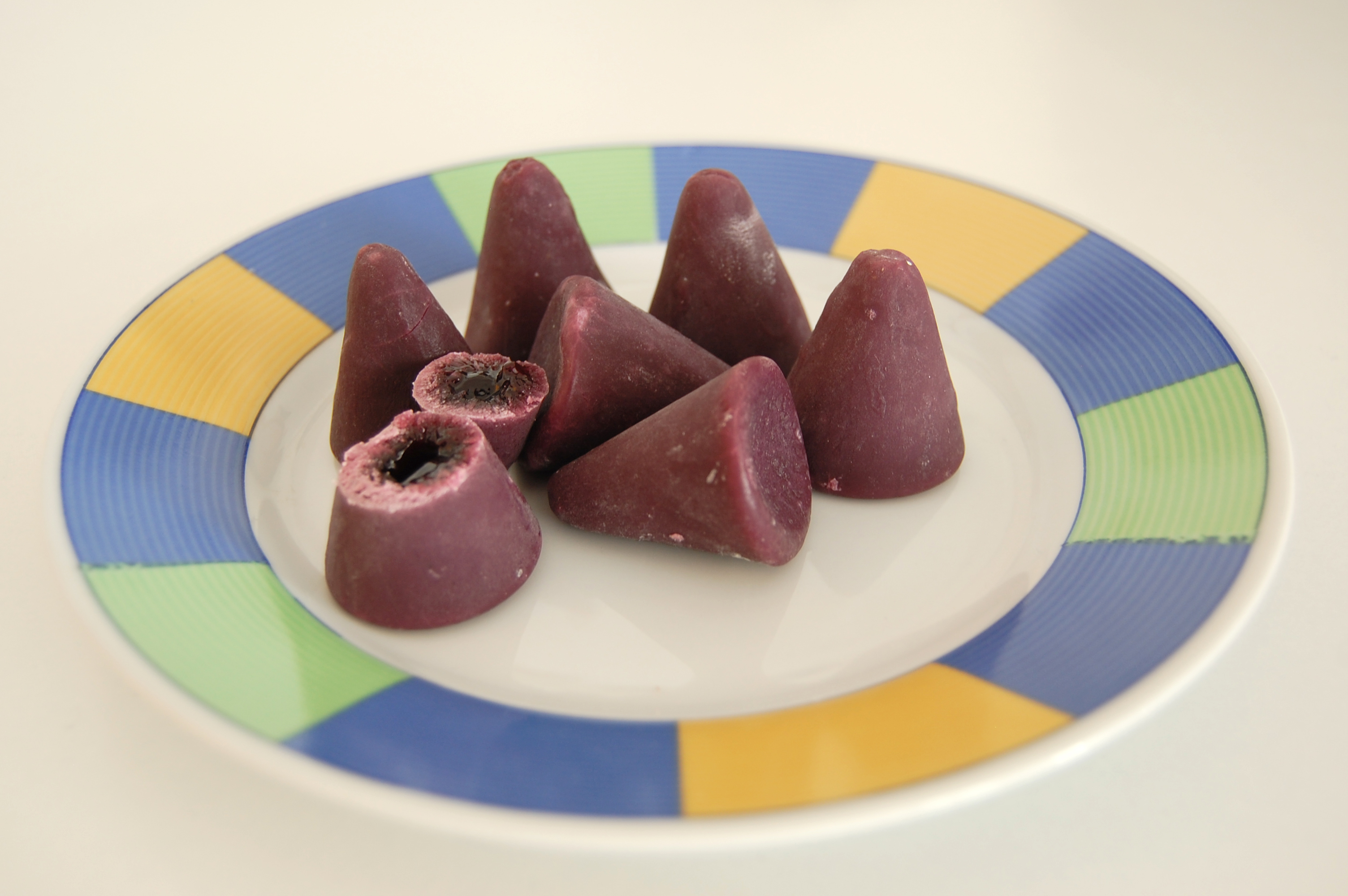
Cuberdon candies

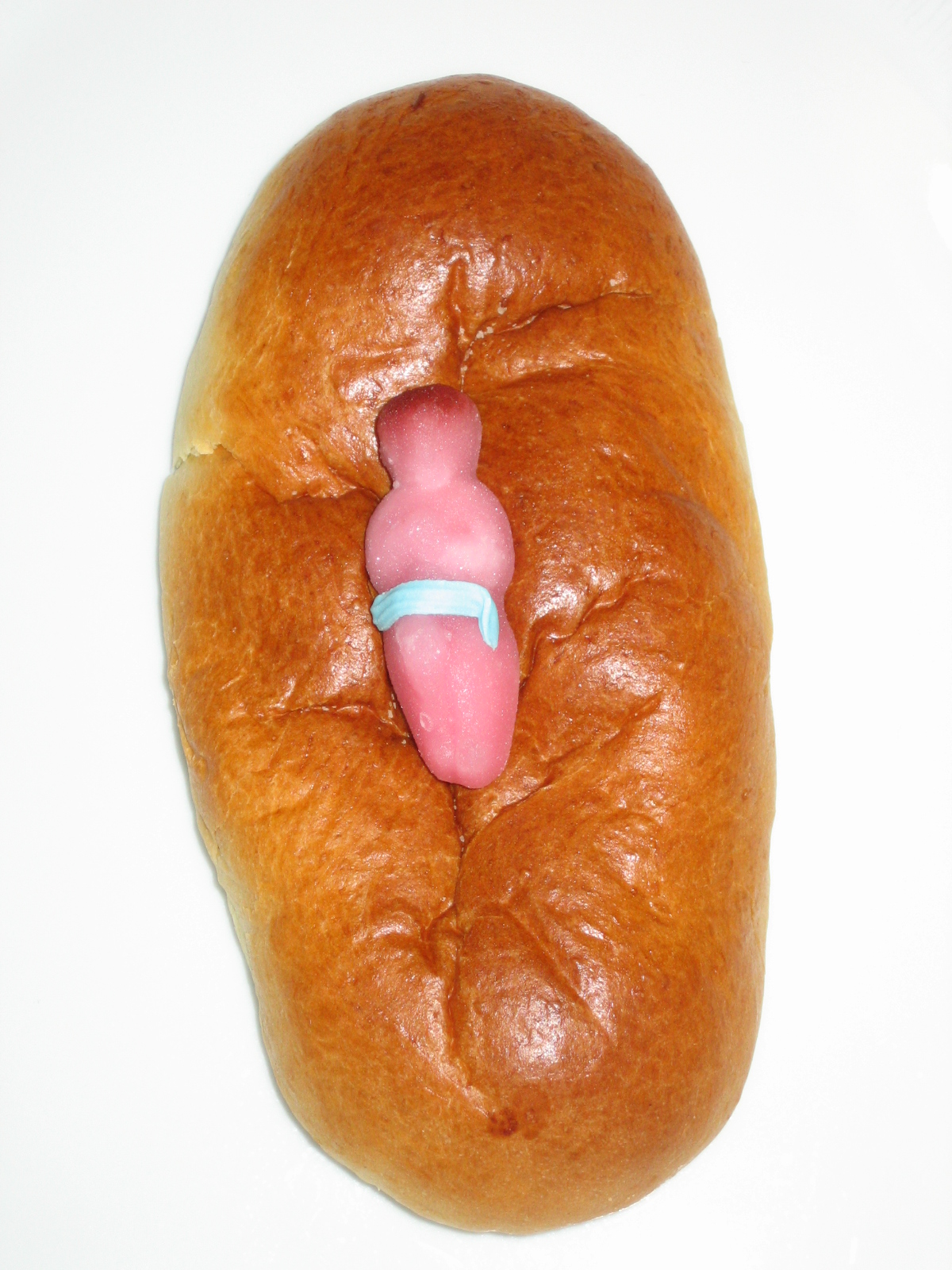
A cougnou Christmas bread

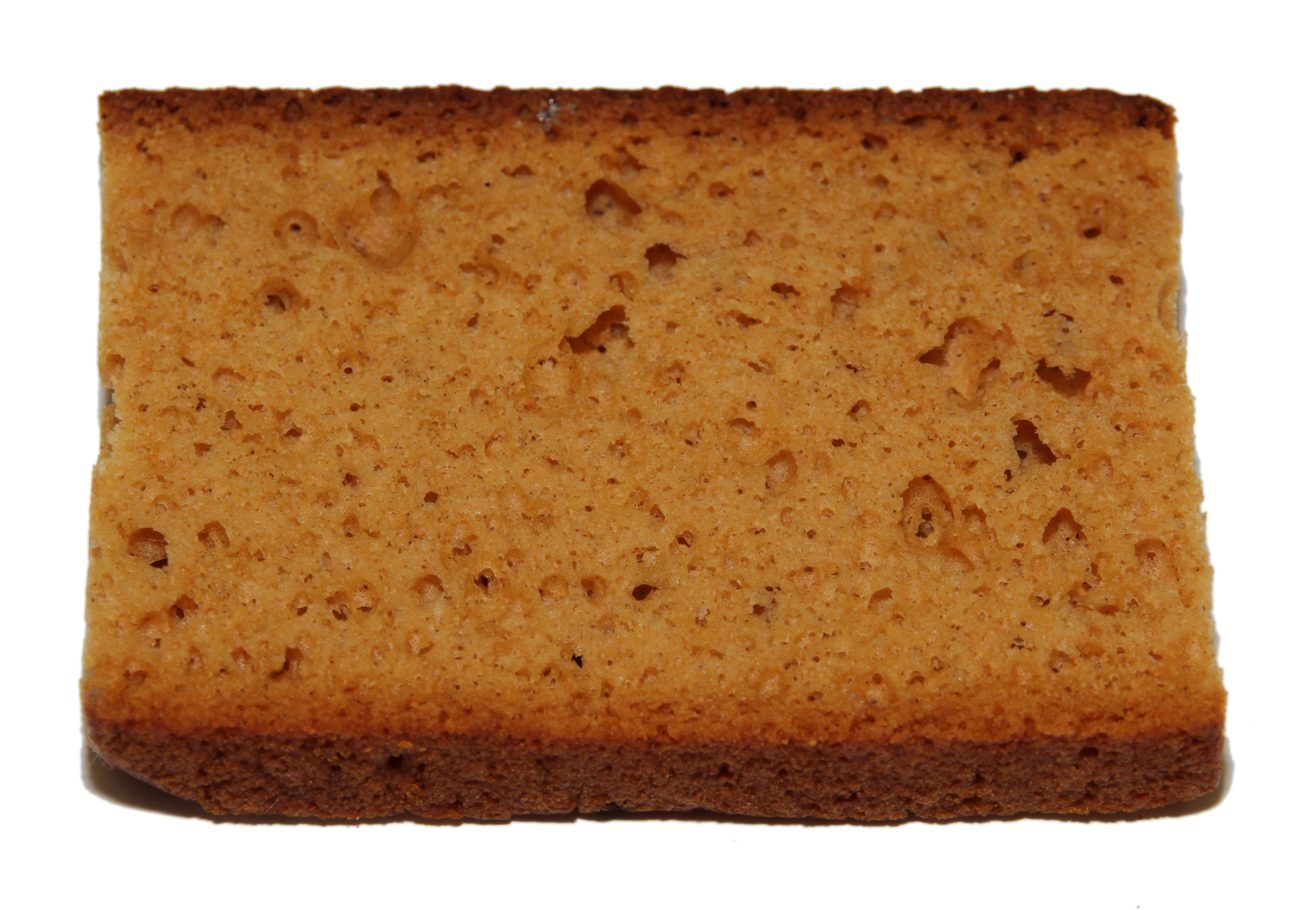
Pain d'épices/Ontbijtkoek spiced bread

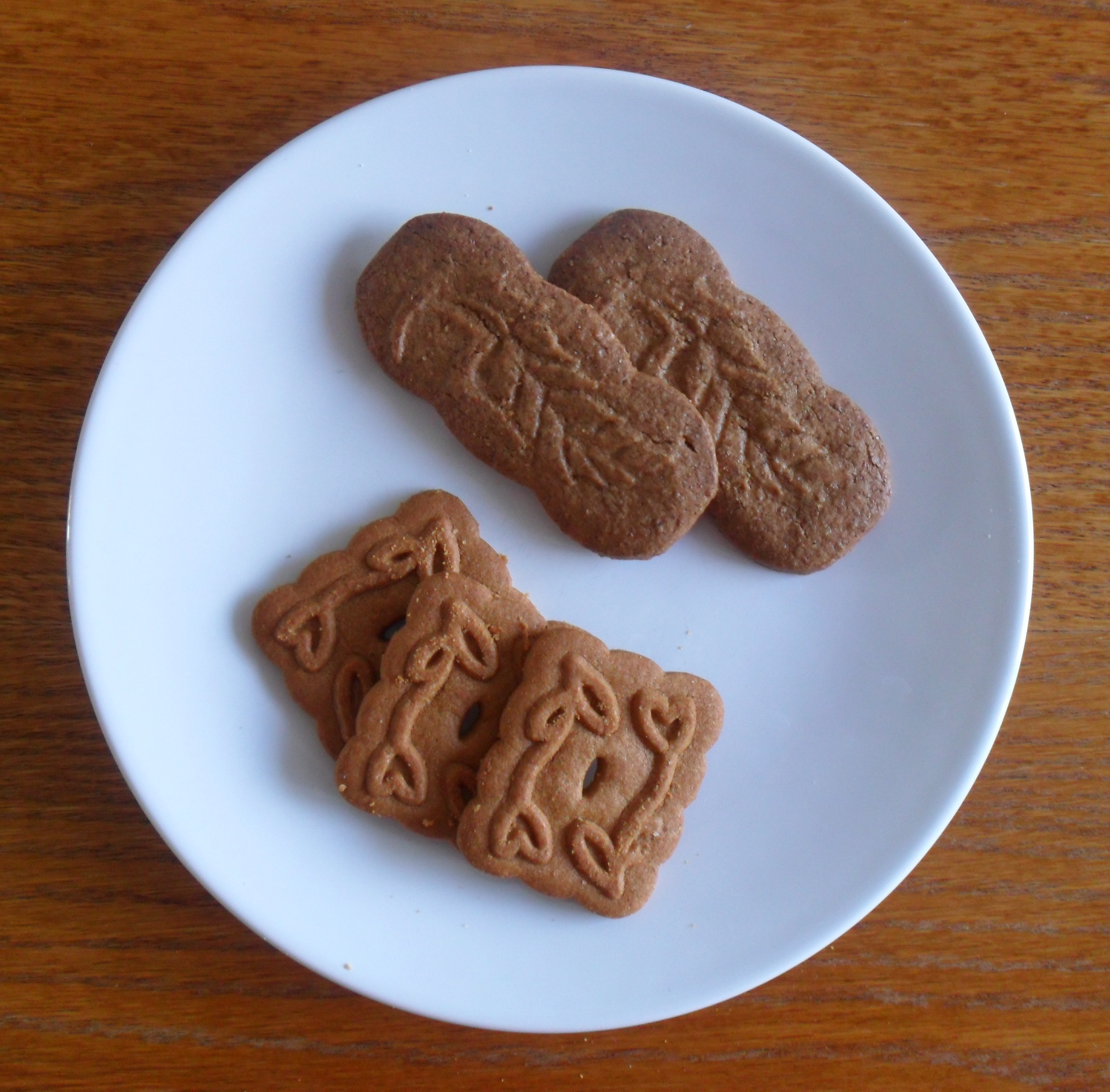
Speculoos cookies

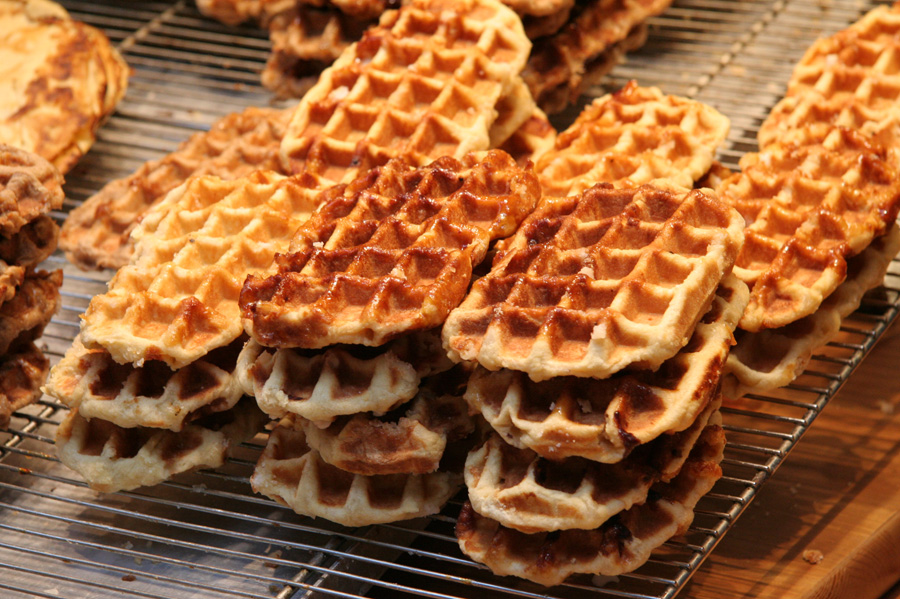
Fresh Liège waffles

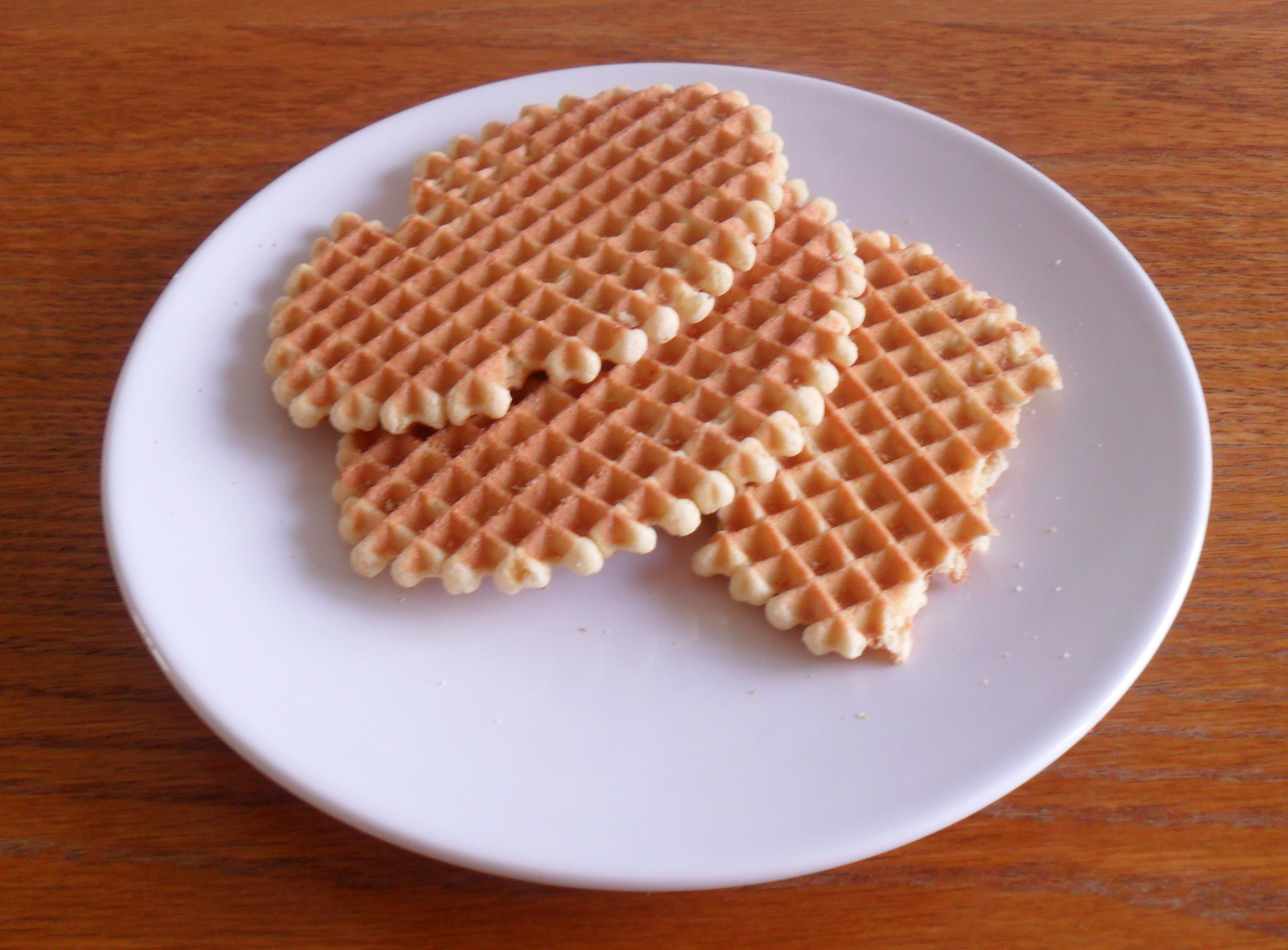
Galettes campinoises

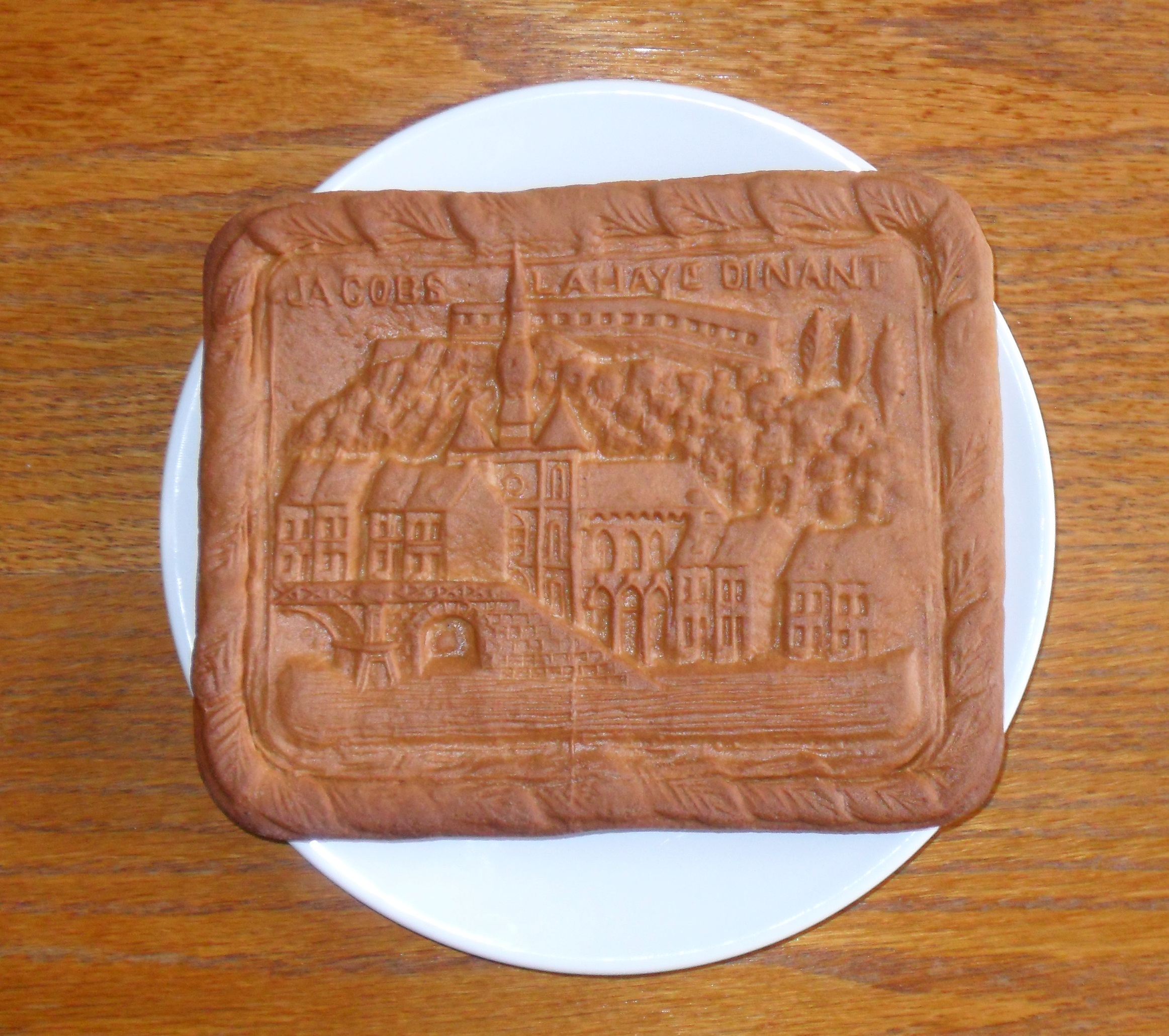
A couque de Dinant biscuit

== See also ==
- Pierre Wynants, Belgian chef
