= Meurens =

Belgian fruit preserve company

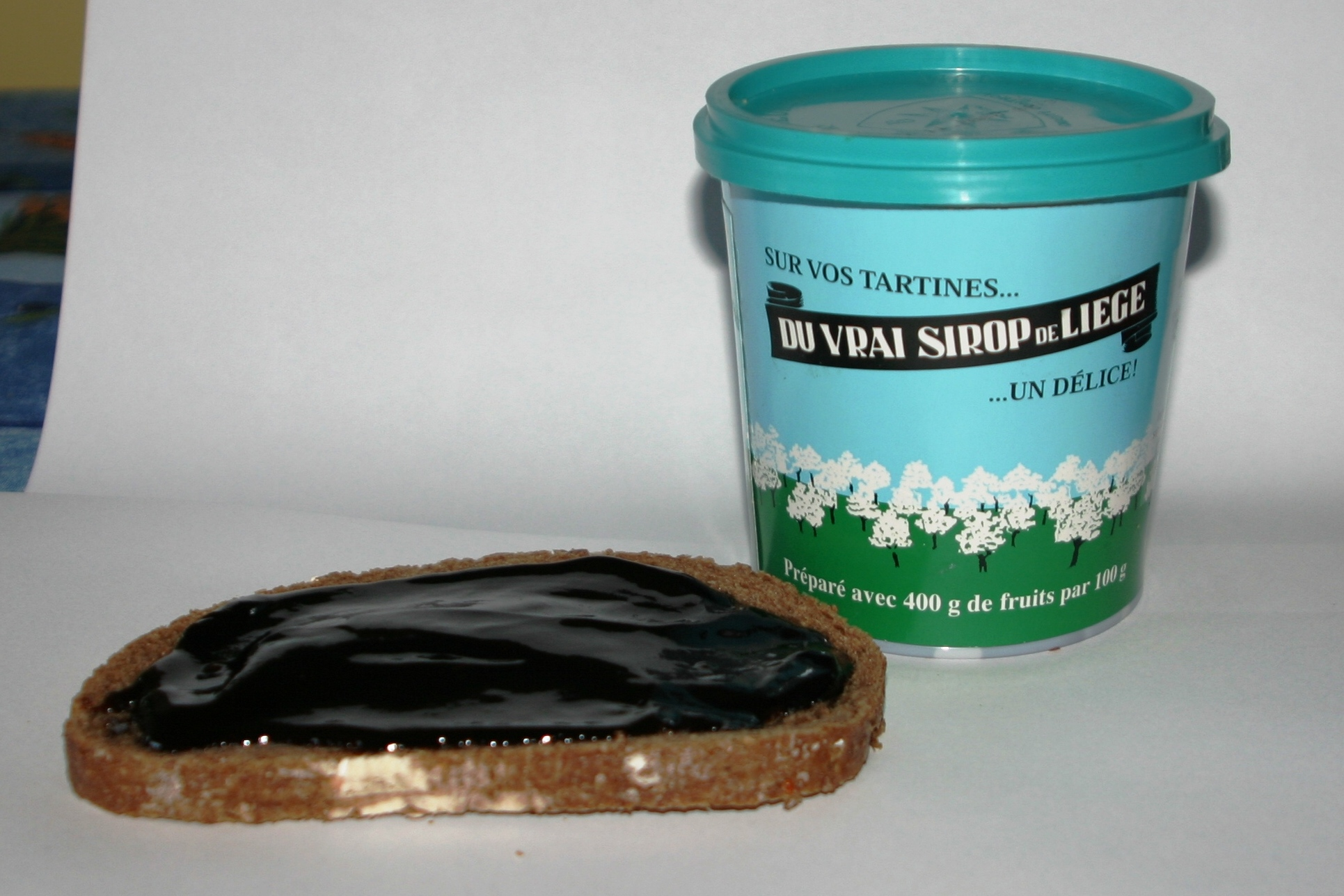
Meurens Sirop de Liège on a tartine

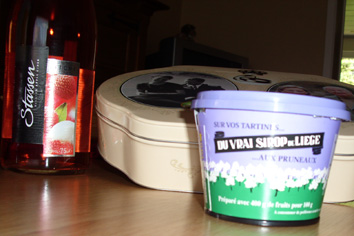
Sirop de Liège with Stassen cider, another Aubel specialty

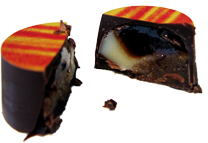
Chocolate truffle filled with apricot and apple butter, buttercream and nuts

Siroperie Meurens is a Belgian family-owned company known for making "Le Vrai Sirop de Liège", a traditional Belgian treat resembling apple butter made of local apples, pears and dates. It is the best known sirop de Liège manufacturer, selling its products under the trademark Vrai Sirop de Liège/Echte Luikse Siroop.

Created in 1902 by Clement Meurens in Aubel, Belgium, Sirop Meurens is an ancestral recipe of a spreadable fruit paste, similar to marmelade or Quince paste. It takes 4 pounds of fruits to make 1 pound of Sirop. Main ingredients are apples, pears and dates. No sugar is added in the refined form but from the abundant local source of sugar beets. Trademarked in 1947, Sirop de Liege is usually served on bread as a tartine or open sandwich, and makes a great a pairing with the regional pungent Fromage de Herve or Herve Cheese it is also use as a base for meatball sauce Boulets à la Liégeoise or pancake sauce boûkète or lacquemant.

Today new flavors such as apricot complete the collection, and the family is still enthousiatically producing this natural product. Beside consumer products such as "Le Vrai Sirop de Liège", "Poiret" and "Pomona" the company also diversified its portfolio into B2B solutions of purees and juice concentrates . The Siroperie offers purees and concentrates from dried fruits (Prunes, raisin, figs, dates, apricot), from fresh fruits (apple, pear) or roots (sugar beet and roasted chicory). Thus responding to the increasing demand of the industry for natural sugar alternatives in various products.

In New York City the tradition is carried on, but in the form of chocolate truffles and bars.
