= Black butter =

Black butter can refer to:

== Cookery ==
- Beurre noir, a simple sauce prepared from butter and lemon juice or vinegar. Typically served with fish, such as in the classic dish of skate with black butter.
- Known in Jèrriais as lé nièr beurre, a dark spicy spread prepared from apples, cider and spices (including liquorice), a traditional speciality of Jersey. It is a variety of apple butter.

== Mineralogy ==
- A type of dacite obtained near the obsidian flows at Glass Buttes, Oregon: so named for its colour and ease of working.

== Music ==
- Black Butter Records, a UK based record label that releases J Hus, Will Heard, Young T & Bugsey, among other artists.
