= Sirop de Liège =

Belgian jam or jelly-like spread

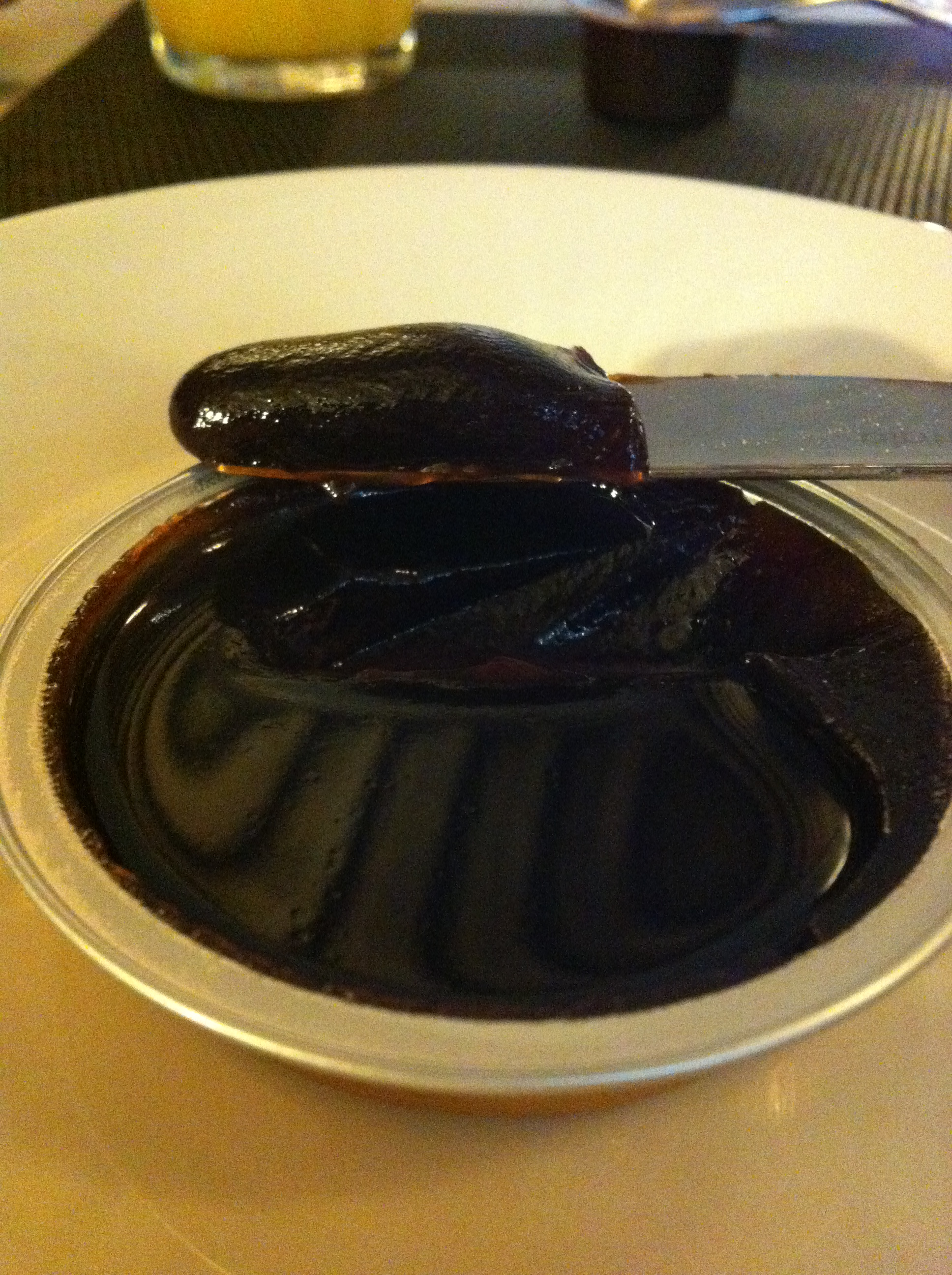
Sirop de Liège

Sirop de Liège (French for Liège syrup, Luikse siroop in Flemish) is a Belgian jam or jelly-like spread. Apple and pear are principally used, often with dates: other fruit such as apricot can be used as well. Sugar and other sweeteners are not normally needed.

Cored fruit is cooked slowly until it falls apart, releasing the pectin from the skin. The compote is then pushed through a passoir, removing the skin, and breaking the fruit into mush. It is then reduced by slow cooking over several hours until the pectin sets, in the same way jam is, then tested by dropping a test piece into cold water. Typically, 6–8 kilograms (13–18 lb) of fruit produce 1 kilogram (2.2 lb) of syrup. The slow cooking process is essential; one guide says that cooking down 12.5 U.S. gal (47 L; 10.4 imp gal) should take about 10 hours.

Sirop de Liège, as its name would suggest, comes from the Liège region of Belgium, which roughly corresponds to the modern Liège Province. Many syrup makers were historically found there, though today syrup makers are primarily concentrated in the Pays de Herve region in the northeast of the province. The largest producer is Meurens in the Aubel municipality, producing two thousand tonnes of it per year under the trademark Vrai Sirop de Liège/Echte Luikse siroop. The area is rich in smaller producers including Charlier in Henri-Chapelle, or Delvaux in Horion-Hozémont.

== Culinary uses ==
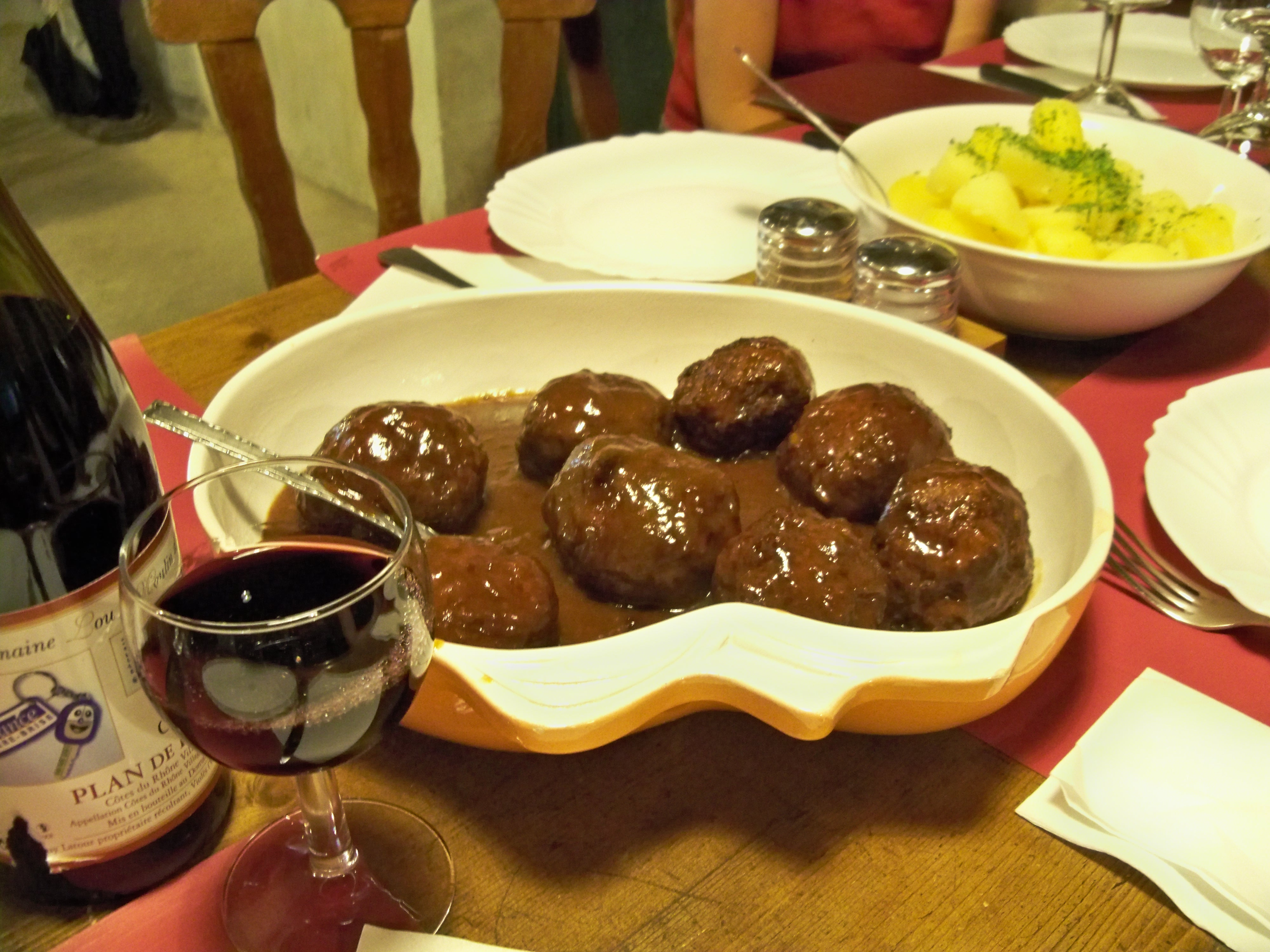
Sirop de Liège is used in the sauce of boulets à la Liégeoise

Its primary use is as a spread, usually on a tartine. It is often accompanied by cheese, such as Herve cheese or maquée, the latter making a dish called stron d'Poye.

It is also used as a sauce or part of a sauce in numerous dishes, serving as pancake sauce on boûkète, or on lacquemant waffles, or sauce for the cooked pear dessert of cûtès Peûres. Sauces with sirop de Liège are even used in the meat dishes boulets à la Liégeoise (meatballs) and lapin à la liégeoise (rabbit).

== Similar dishes ==
- Apple butter – sirop de Liège could be considered a type of apple butter, though sirop de Liège always includes pears and often includes other fruits as well
- Appelstroop – a similar Dutch spread, usually made without pears
- Birnenhonig – a similar Swiss spread made of pear juice
- Nièr beurre or black butter – a similar Jersey spread made from apples and spices
- Vin cuit – a similar Swiss reduction
