= Dinah's Chicken =

Restaurant information
- Established: 1967
- Owner: Pearson family
- Food type: Fried chicken
- Location: 4106 San Fernando Rd suite A, Glendale, Los Angeles, California, 91204, United States
- Website: dinahschicken.com

Dinah's Chicken is a fried chicken restaurant located on San Fernando Road in Glendale, California.

== History ==
Dinah's Chicken was opened for business in 1967 by the Pearson family who continue to own and operate the restaurant.

== Cuisine ==
Lunch and dinner are served all day and include chicken pieces like breasts and drumsticks. Each plate comes with a roll and apple butter.

== Name confusion ==
A similar restaurant in Culver City named "Dinah's Family Restaurant" sells the same chicken in identically designed buckets but both restaurants have always been independently owned. The two restaurants both began with the same idea by a group of friends.

== Reception ==
Dinah's Chicken was featured on Eater's list of 17 fantastic fried chicken restaurants in Los Angeles. Eater highlighted the "Pitch-perfect seasonings" that coupled with the "pressure-cooking deep-fryer" made for "superbly moist" chicken.

== In popular culture ==
The Hoover family is seen eating Dinah's Chicken for dinner in the opening scene of Little Miss Sunshine.

Isaac Hayes is seen with leftover Dinah's chicken in the opening scene of Truck Turner.
