= Berwinne =

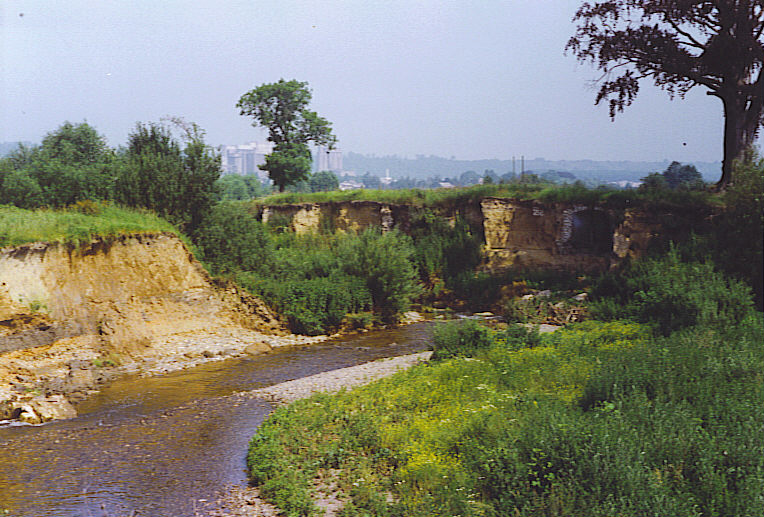

Location
- Country: Belgium

Physical characteristics
- Source
  - location: Liège Province
- Mouth
  - location: Meuse
  - coordinates: 50.7554°N 5.6834°E
- Length: 32 km (20 mi)

Basin features
- Progression: Meuse→ North Sea

The Berwinne (French: [bɛʁwin]; Flemish: Berwijn [bɛrˈʋɛin]) is a small river in the north-eastern part of Belgium. It is a right-bank tributary to the Meuse river and flows over a distance of 31.9 kilometres (19.8 miles) through the provinces of Liège and Limburg. Its source is located in the eastern part of the municipality of Aubel, near the Henri-Chapelle American Cemetery and Memorial. From there the Berwinne river flows, generally spoken, in northwestern direction, through places like Val-Dieu Abbey, Dalhem, and Moelingen, before joining the Meuse between Visé and the Dutch border.
