= List of protected heritage sites in Aubel =

This table shows an overview of the protected heritage sites in the Walloon town Aubel. This list is part of Belgium's national heritage.

Object	Year/architect	Town/section	Address	Coordinates	Number^{?}	Image
Oratory St. Hubert ^{(nl)} ^{(fr)}		Aubel	place F. Nicolaï	50.705307°N 5.857908°E	63003-CLT-0001-01 Info	Oratoire St Hubert, place F. Nicolaï
Gorhez oak tree ^{(nl)} ^{(fr)}		Aubel		50.698779°N 5.831393°E	63003-CLT-0002-01 Info	Eik op het terrein van Gorhez
Hombourg-Vogelzanck American military cemetery ^{(nl)} ^{(fr)}		Aubel		50.708112°N 5.889368°E	63003-CLT-0003-01 Info	Militaire Amerikaanse Begraafplaats Hombourg-Vogelzanck en omgeving
Farmhouse ^{(nl)} ^{(fr)}		Aubel	Langstraat n° 343	50.700022°N 5.838332°E	63003-CLT-0005-01 Info	Boerderij, Langstraat n° 343
Organs of the church of la Clouse ^{(nl)} ^{(fr)}		Aubel		50.692781°N 5.898124°E	63003-CLT-0007-01 Info	
House ^{(nl)} ^{(fr)}		Aubel	place Antoine Ernst n° 9	50.704234°N 5.858824°E	63003-CLT-0008-01 Info	Gevels en daken van het gebouw te place Antoine Ernst n° 9
House ^{(nl)} ^{(fr)}		Aubel	place Antoine Ernst n° 16	50.703944°N 5.859043°E	63003-CLT-0009-01 Info	Gevels en daken van het gebouw te place Antoine Ernst, n° 16
House ^{(nl)} ^{(fr)}		Aubel	place Antoine Ernst n° 29	50.704214°N 5.858167°E	63003-CLT-0010-02 Info	Oostelijke déclassée van de gevel van het gebouw te place Antoine Ernst, n° 29
100-year-old chestnut tree ^{(nl)} ^{(fr)}		Aubel		50.710471°N 5.805964°E	63003-CLT-0011-01 Info	De honderd jaar oude kastanje groeiende aan de voorkant van de oude terrein "de Donéa" te Sart-by-Aubel
Val-Dieu Abbey ^{(nl)} ^{(fr)}		Aubel		50.698080°N 5.805385°E	63003-CLT-0016-01 Info	Gebouwen die samen de oude abdij van Val-Dieu vormen te Charneux
Grounds of the Val-Dieu Abbey ^{(nl)} ^{(fr)}		Aubel		50.696000°N 5.806583°E	63003-CLT-0017-01 Info	Ensemble gevormd door de gebouwen van de oude abdij van Val-Dieu en het omliggende land te Charneux
Grounds extension of the Val-Dieu Abbey ^{(nl)} ^{(fr)}		Aubel		50.699048°N 5.805559°E	63003-CLT-0018-01 Info	Ensemble gevormd door de uitbreiding van de site bestaande uit gebouwen van de oude abdij van Val-Dieu en het omliggende land

== See also ==
- List of protected heritage sites in Liège (province)
