= Fruit butter =

Sweet fruit spread

- Powidl, a European plum butter
- Type: Spread
- Main ingredients: Fruit

A fruit butter, or lekvar, is a sweet spread made of fruit cooked to a paste, then lightly sweetened. It falls into the same category as jelly and jam, but is differentiated by its completely smooth texture. Apple butter and plum butter are common examples, but fruit butters can be made from any firm fruit. Fruits with a higher water content may also be used if given longer cooking times. Other commonly used fruits are pears, peaches, cherries, nectarines, berries, squashes, and apricots. Fruit pastes, such as quince cheese are popular in Latin American countries, are similar but more highly sweetened and jelled. They are sold in shallow tins or as wrapped bricks, while fruit butters usually come in wide-mouthed jars and are more common in Central and Eastern Europe.

In order to make fruit butter, the fruit is cut into pieces and simmered in water on a low temperature until much of the fruit's water has evaporated, and is then blended with a food mill or immersion blender to a dense and spreadable consistency. Sweeteners like honey, sugar, or maple syrup are sometimes added, as well as spices. After this, they can continue to cook until the sugars caramelize, possibly with use of a slow cooker.

Fruit butters are most commonly preserved in cans in room temperature spaces, if the fruit used is high in acid. Fruits that are lower in acid, like squashes, should be frozen.

== Romanian Magiun of Topoloveni ==
In Romania, Magiun of Topoloveni (plum butter of Topoloveni) is a food specialty with protected designation of origin (PDO) which is made entirely out of one ingredient: plums, without any sweeteners or preservatives.

== Ukrainian Lekvar ==
Properly prepared lekvar does not spoil for a long time, it was used throughout the calendar year. Lekvar is of great importance in the daily life of the peasants.

Plum lekvar is a very thick jam, dark blue, almost black with a rich plum taste and a slight sourness. Lekvar is made from a plum of a variety of Hungarian or fasting plums (plums). Depending on the variety of plums and the degree of ripeness of the fruits, the lekvar has a more pronounced sweet or sour taste. The preparation process has several stages.

- First, men shake the trees from which plums fall on a flat cloth or tarpaulin.
- Then women wash the fruit and take out the bones.
- In the garden, a pit is pulled out, bricks, smearing with clay, or set the oven, prepare firewood, a large cauldron is installed, in which the collected plums are poured.
- Boiled plum mass should be continuously stirred with a wooden thorn, similar to the paddle until it thickens completely. The process can last from 7-8 to 25-30 hours. Thanks to constant mixing and friction of the plums, even the plum peel dissolved and the product became a homogeneous liquid, excessive water gradually evaporated and the fruit liquid switched to a thick and dark lekvar (the thicker the plum mass was, the better the quality of the product.)

Lekvar could be stored not only until the new harvest, but also for several years in a row. Already ready-made lekvar was packed in ceramic rigs and put them in a heated oven so that a hard skin was formed on the surface. Then bandaged with a homespun cloth or covered with paper and carried to the attic of the house for storage.

== Varieties ==
- Apple butter
- Banana paste (mariola)
- Cherry butter
- Fig butter or paste
- Guava paste (Cajeta de guayaba, mariola or bocadillo)
- Magiun of Topoloveni
- Mango butter or paste (Cajeta de mango)
- Pear butter
- Plum butter, such as (powidl) (Poland, Austria, Czech Republic) and magiun of Topoloveni (Romania)
- Pumpkin butter
- Sirop de Liège
- Lekvar
- Appelstroop (The Netherlands)
