= Mouland =

Mouland may refer to:

- Mark Mouland (born 1961), Welsh professional golfer
- Moelingen, village in Voeren municipality, Limburg province, Flanders, Belgium
