= Servais Duriau =

Cistercian monk (1701-1775)

Laurent Servais Duriau (5 April 1701 – 15 July 1775), known as Servais, was a Cistercian monk from the Abbey of Val-Dieu. An encyclopedist, he catalogued vast numbers of engravings.

== Biography ==
He was the fourth child of the manager of the episcopal palace at Liège, Laurent Duriau, and Anne-Jeanne Hanrion. They were a wealthy urban family. On 23 August 1722, Servais became a Cistercian monk at Val-Dieu. At that time, the abbey was enjoying an economical, cultural, and spiritual high. Duriau was ordained a priest in 1725, served as confessor for two nuns' abbeys, one was Orienten Abbey (Abbaye d'Orienten) and the other Burtscheid near Aachen. In 1752, he was sub-prior at Val-Dieu and remained so for 23 years. In 1772, he celebrated his 50th anniversary of taking monastic vows.

In addition to his monastic duties, Servais Duriau nurtured his encyclopedic passion by dedicating untold hours to the imposing volumes in his collection, each containing between 300 and 2000 patiently annotated engravings. Servais Duriau died in 1775.

== Works ==
His 32 volumes, of which 27 are known today, include more than 20,000 engravings from the years around 1500 to 1775. They originated in France, the Netherlands, and Germany. 19 of the volumes are kept today in at the Cathedral of Liège in the Duriau Collection; seven volumes have been identified in private collections, and five others are reputed to be lost. Parts of the collection were hidden, sold and scattered between 1796 and 1840, then finally bought back to Val-Dieu Abbey.

The Duriau collection is the subject of frequent study, as it provides a view of the world during the Enlightenment. A major restoration, financed by the King Baudouin Foundation, is currently being completed. The rich iconography of the collection can be seen in the 2007 book devoted to the "Walloon Print Heritage".

== Bibliography ==
- Brouette, Émile / Dimier, Anselme / Manning, Eugène: Dictionnaire des auteurs cisterciens (Documentation cistercienne 16.1) (Rochefort: Abbaye Notre-Dame de St-Remy, 1975, vol. 1, p. 222.
