= Birnenhonig =

Syrup made from pear juice

- Alternative names: Sirop de Liège (Belgium), pear butter (North America)
- Type: Spread
- Place of origin: Switzerland
- Main ingredients: Pears

Birnenhonig (German: pear honey) is a syrup made from pears in central Switzerland. In North America it is known as pear butter. It is very similar to the Belgian spread sirop de Liège.

== Production ==
The pears are boiled and then pressed to obtain juice. The liquid is then heated for six to seven hours. The end product is sweet, opaque, creamy, dark brown and is consumed as a spread on bread or as a main ingredient for Luzerner Lebkuchen, a type of gingerbread. During the Second World War, milk with Birnenhonig was often consumed as an alternative to milky coffee because of the scarcity of coffee.

== See also ==
- Apple butter
- List of spreads
- Sirop de Liège
