= Germknödel =

German and Austrian yeast dough dumpling

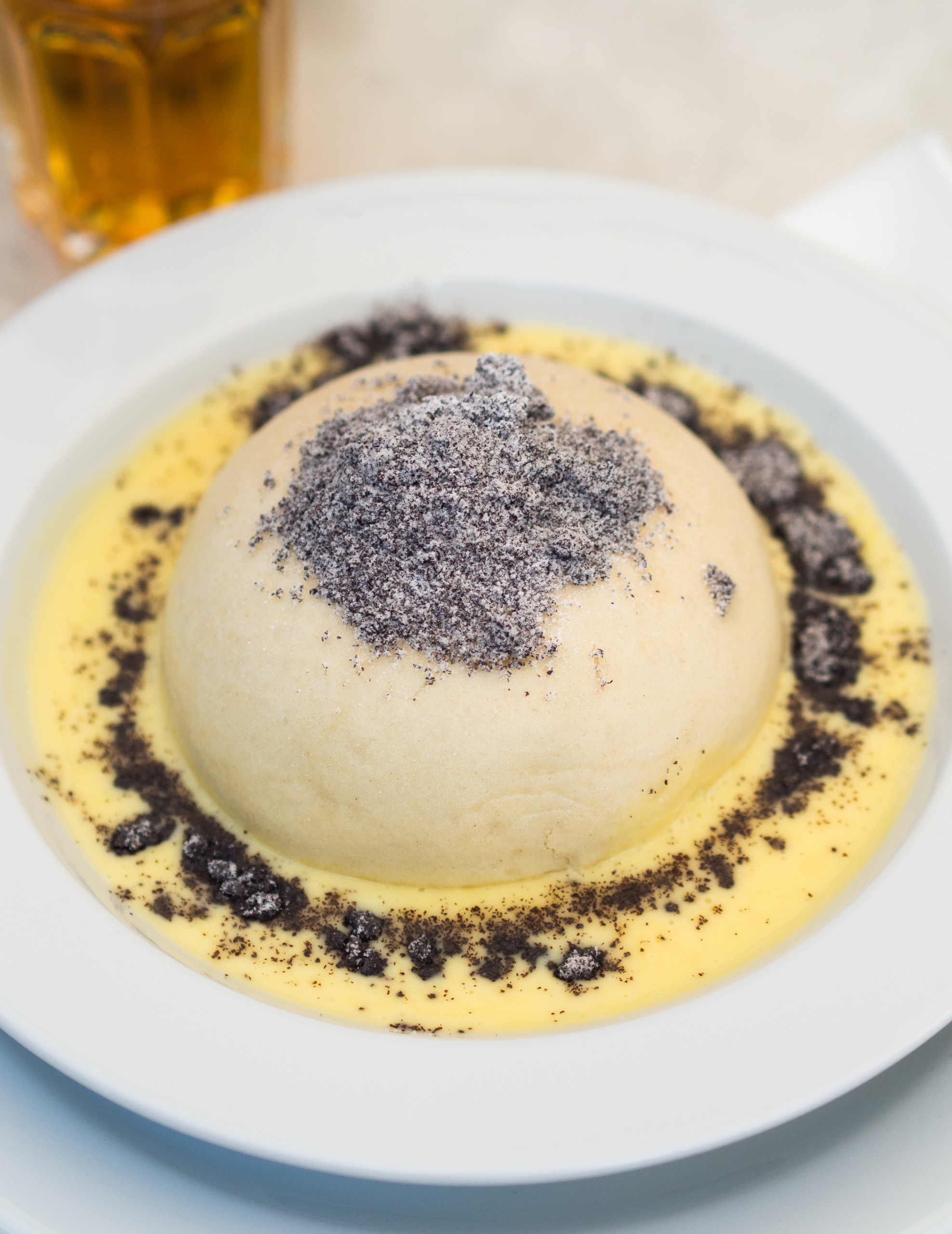
- Germknödel with vanilla sauce
- Type: Sweet dumpling
- Place of origin: Germany and Austria
- Main ingredients: Yeast dough, sugar, fat (usually butter), poppy seeds, sugar, spiced plum jam

Germknödel (Austrian German pronunciation: [ˈɡɛɐ̯mˌknøːdl̩]) is a sweet, fluffy, yeast dough dumpling (Knödel), filled with spiced plum jam, topped with a mix of poppy seeds and sugar, and served with melted butter. It is occasionally, even though less traditional, served with vanilla cream sauce instead. It is a culinary specialty of Austria and Bavaria. The dish is served both as a dessert and as a main course. It is considered a Mehlspeise or 'flour dish', popular with both Catholics during Lent and Jews.

Germknödel is usually a spherical or bun-shaped dessert. The dessert's main ingredient is a yeast dough enriched with sugar and fat, usually butter. The dumpling is filled with Powidl, a sweet plum jam flavoured with cloves and cinnamon. The dumpling is steamed and served while hot with melted butter or vanilla sauce, and topped with crushed poppy seeds and sugar.

Austrian Germknödel (Germ being the exclusively Austrian word for yeast) is similar to the German and Alsatian dish Dampfnudel, an unfilled dumpling. Germknödel is generally steamed over or sometimes boiled in salted water. Dampfnudel are cooked in a small amount of a mixture of milk and butter, and by the end of the cooking process, as the milk has evaporated, become lightly fried on the bottom.

Steamed sweet dumplings (buchty na pare) are also a typical food in Slovakia and Czechia, usually filled with plum marmalade and often served during winter by ski resort restaurants.

== See also ==
- List of steamed foods
