= Powidl =

Sweet prune spread

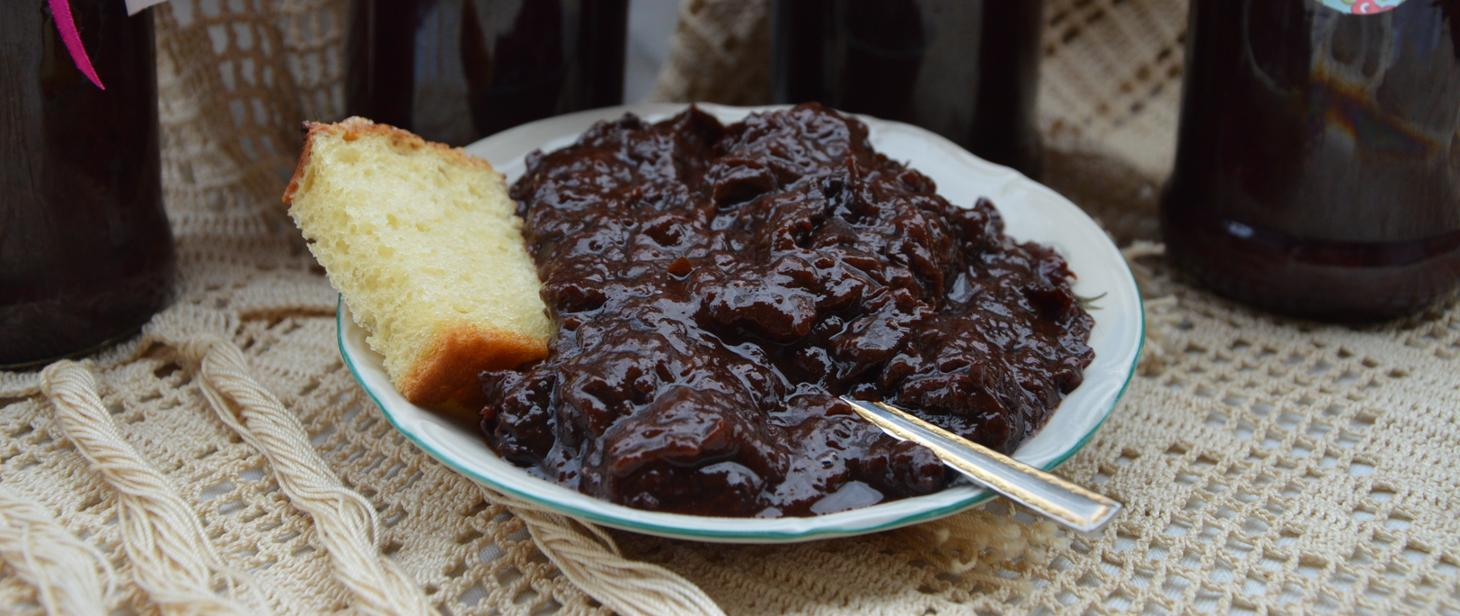
- Polish powidl from prune
- Type: Spread
- Main ingredients: Prune plums

A powidl (also porvidl, powidła, povidla, or powidel) is a plum butter, a type of fruit spread prepared from the prune plum, that is popular in Central Europe. Unlike jam or marmalade, and unlike the German Pflaumenmus (plum puree), powidl is prepared without additional sweeteners or gelling agents.

Powidl is cooked for several hours, in order to achieve the necessary sweetness and consistency. The plums used should be harvested as late as possible, ideally after the first frosts, in order to ensure they contain enough sugar.

In Austria, Moravia and Bohemia, powidl is the basis for Buchteln, powidl cake and Germknödel, but it is also used as a sandwich spread. Powidl will keep for a long time, especially if kept in traditional crockery.

Traditionally, large amounts of powidl to be used as a winter store and natural sweetener were prepared in late autumn during a communal event. Since constantly stirring the pot was exhausting work, people took turns, and did easier work in between turns. The Czech term povidla is plural only (the Polish word powidła as well).

Traditionally the plums were "overcooked," (to promote evaporation) in a copper kettle, or sometimes vinegar preserved, or even steamed. One recipe for "dark red plum jam" (powidl) begins with placing the plums in a fermentation crock along with sugar and cider vinegar, and letting the mixture sit for a day before cooking. Another recipe for "traditional Austrian plum butter" recommends roasting the plums in an oven and then transforming that compote-like dish into jam.

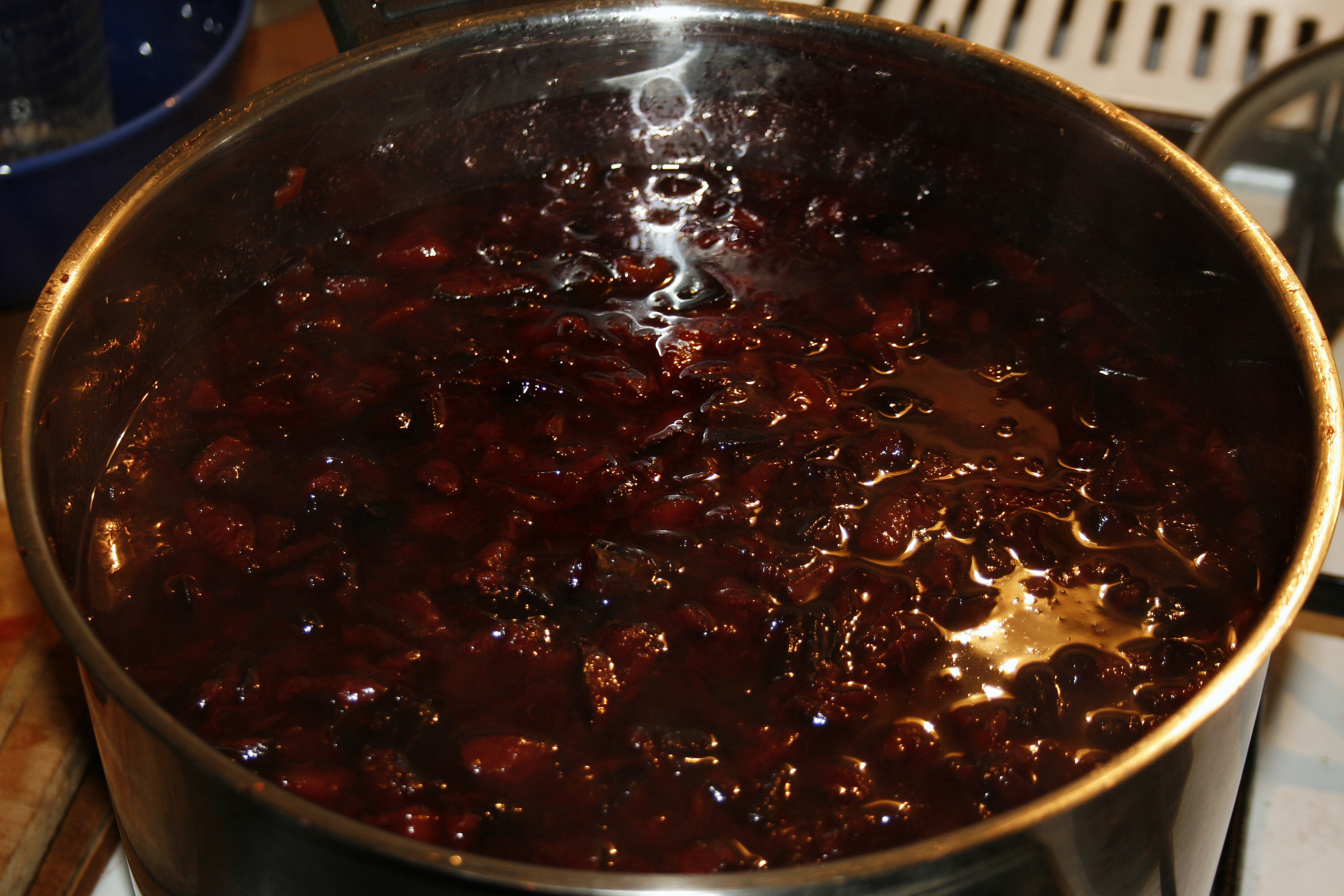
Cooking down the fruit for povidla made in Czechia

Powidl is a key ingredient of the popular Austrian street food pofesen, which is a jam-filled form of French toast.

== Historical context ==
Unlike with modern fruit spreads, the original method of long-boiling kills almost all germs while the water removal provides for high sugars content (above 70%), acting as a natural preservative.

In this the traditional method of production allows for a long shelf life even in unsealed containers. This property made powidl unique among other pre-industrial fruit products available in the area.

The choice of prune plums, as compared to other sugar-rich fruit grown in the area, including other plum varieties, is their ripening as one of the last fruits in the season, after the main harvest. The prune trees are less sensitive to cold, making them popular in harsher climate areas. Powidl and Slivovitz, being both products of the fruit with long and very long storage, allowed yearly prunes harvest fluctuations to be compensated readily.

The prune plums are naturally suitable for processing, compared to other late-season fruit. When ripe, the prune core separates from the shell easily, unlike with other plum varieties, and the fruit skin has little structural strength, dissolving while cooked.

The sturdier Apple or Pear fruit require mechanical core separation and either the removal or pre-processing of the tough skins before cooking. While such processing can be economical with modern machinery, it was a major challenge in the pre-industrial era or in a household setting.

=== Historic role in cooking ===
The high-sugar content, combined with good availability and storability, made Powidl into the general sweetener in many traditional recipes.

Before processed sugar became affordable with industrial production, Powidl/Povidla was one of the main sweeteners in many local cuisines, alongside honey.

== Current availability ==
Most commercial products sold as Powidl/Povidla are made from dried fruit and fruit puree, using ingredients from not fully ripe fruits, then sweetened by processed sugar.

The original production recipe Powidl/Povidla is still made under various markings like "organic", "traditional" etc. While a good indication is that traditional Powidl must not include any other ingredient but fruits, that itself is not a guarantee that the traditional long-cooking process was used. Cheaper method of mixing dried fruit with fruit spread and then cooking only shortly is commonly used in production.

The traditional method Powidl have a distinct bittery and soury taste from the over-cooking that causes a different composition of the product as compared to the short-cooked versions.

== See also ==
- Pączki
- Lekvar
- Apple butter
- Varenye
- Magiun of Topoloveni
