= Plum butter =

Fruit butter made of plums

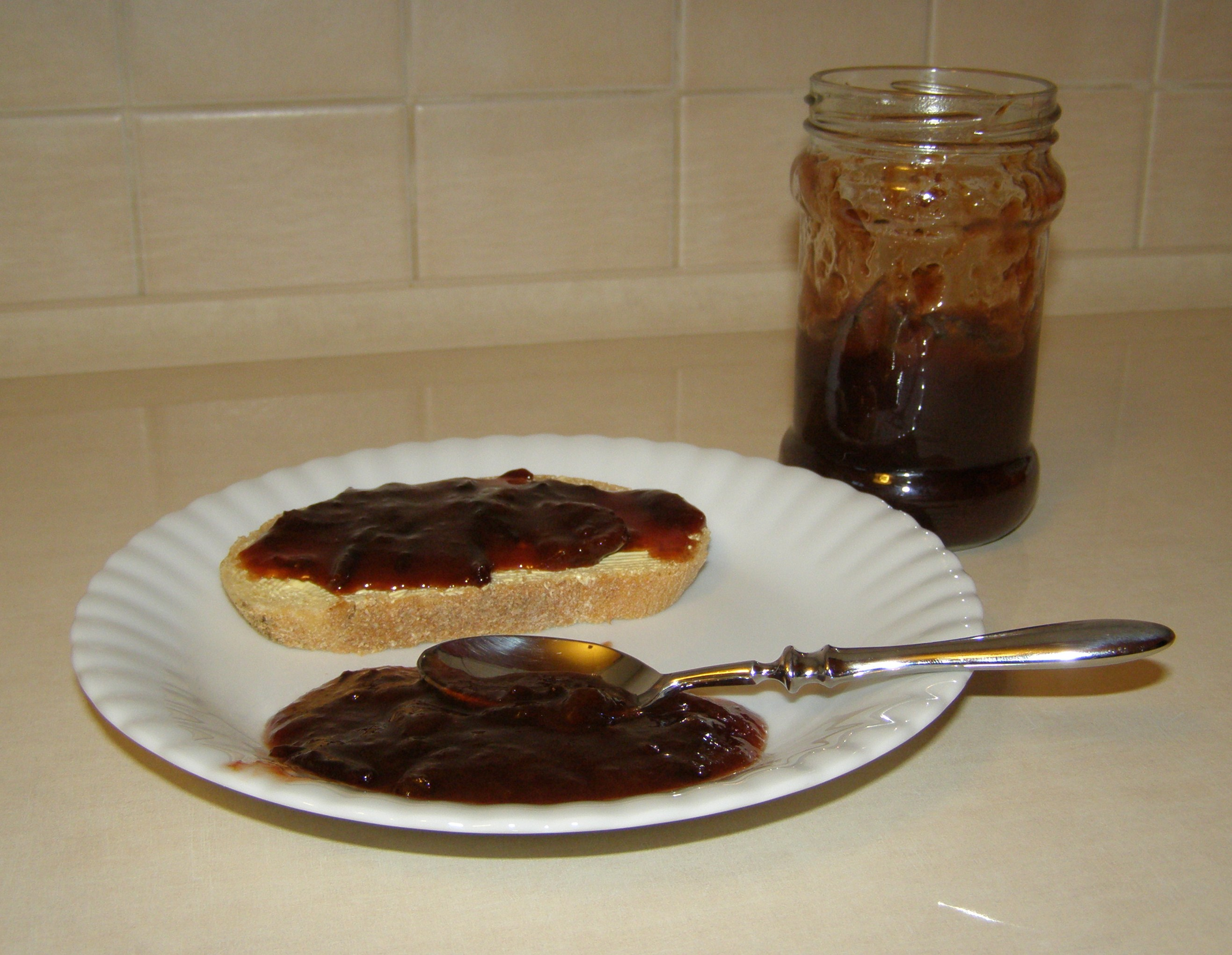
Powidl, a kind of plum butter

Plum butter is a type of fruit butter made out of plums. The plums are cooked until reduced to a paste. Spices, preservatives, or sweeteners can be added.

== Varieties ==
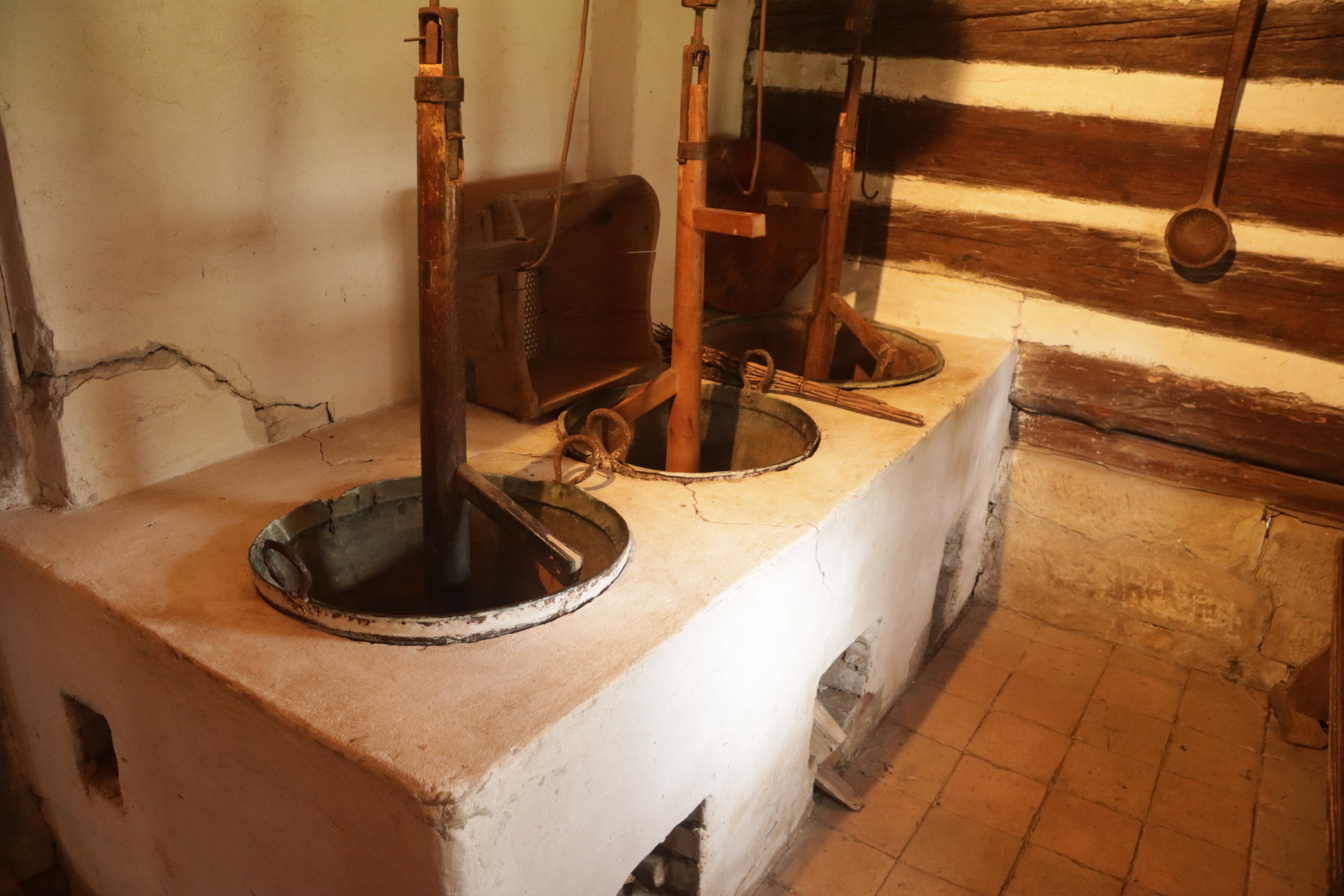
Traditional plum butter manufacturing in Vysočina, Czech Republic

- Magiun is the Romanian type of plum butter. One version, magiun of Topoloveni is a food specialty with protected designation of origin (PDO) which is contains 100% plums, without any sweeteners or preservatives allowed.
- Powidl is a plum butter popular in Central Europe, particularly in Austria, Czech Republic, Poland. It is prepared usually without additional sweeteners or gelling agents, though there are recipes in Austria which allow the addition of spices and/or sugar For example, in order for a product to be called powidl on the Austrian market must contain at least 53% dry matter and a maximum content of added sugar of up to 30%.
- Pflaumenmus is the German version. In order for the plum butter to be called pflaumenmus on the German market, the product must meet the following requirements: Per 1000 g pflaumenmus, at least 1400 g pitted plums must be used and a maximum of 300 g sugar. Of the 1400 g fruit, a maximum of 350 g may come from dried plums. The dry matter must be at least 50%.

== See also ==
- Fruit butter
- Powidl
- Magiun of Topoloveni
- Plum
