= Magiun of Topoloveni =

Romanian plum jam

- Type: Jam
- Place of origin: Romania
- Region or state: Topoloveni, Argeș County
- Main ingredients: Plums

Magiun of Topoloveni is a Romanian traditional plum based spread, which has received a Protected Geographical Status from the European Union since 2011. Magiun of Topoloveni is a kind of jam made from very ripe plum fruit varieties, without any added sugar. It is from the town of Topoloveni and surrounding villages in the Argeș County.

== History ==
The recipe of magiun of Topoloveni dates back to 1914 when the first magiun factory was opened by a local family (the Maximilian Popovici family) and contains at least 4 varieties of plums.

The magiun of Topoloveni is produced exclusively in the area amidst the localities of Boțarcani, Crințești, Goleștii Bădii, Gorănești, Inurile, Țigănești, Topoloveni, and Vițichești. This region, particularly suitable for growing plums, belongs to the Argeș County, in the historical region of Wallachia. The plum orchards cover about 17,000 hectares (42,000 acres).

The magiun became the first Romanian certified natural product, protected by European Union by order No. 338/2011 dated April 7, 2011. The European Commission has recognized a protected designation of origin and protected geographical indication in Magiun of Topoloveni.

In 2003, Romania deployed troops in Afghanistan, as a member of NATO. In 2009, 100% natural magiun of Topoloveni replaced marmalade in all NATO bases. In 2010, the factory of Topoloveni was appointed official supplier to the Romanian Royal House.

== Etymology ==
The word magiun come from the Turkish language macun which means "spread".

== Preparation ==
The magiun of Topoloveni recipe, requires four different types of plums, which are cooked for 10 hours without sugar in very low heat until the magiun sticks to the spoon. The magiun of Topoloveni is a thick, dark brown paste, with dry matter content at a minimum of 55%. This concentration, which corresponds to 55 °Brix, ensures the preservation of the product, at a temperature of 20 °C (68 °F) maximum, without the addition of any additives.

Plums used for the production of magiun of Topoloveni belong to various local varieties of Prunus domestica: Boambe of Leordeni, Bistrițeana, Brumarii, Centenar, Dâmbovița, Grasa ameliorată, Grasa Românesca, Pescăruș, Piteștean, Silvia, Stanley, Tomnatici Caransebeș, Tuleu gras, Tuleu timpuriu, Vâlcean, Vînăta Româneasca.

== See also ==
- Fruit butter
- Plum butter
- Jam
- Powidl
