= Boûkète =

Belgian pancake

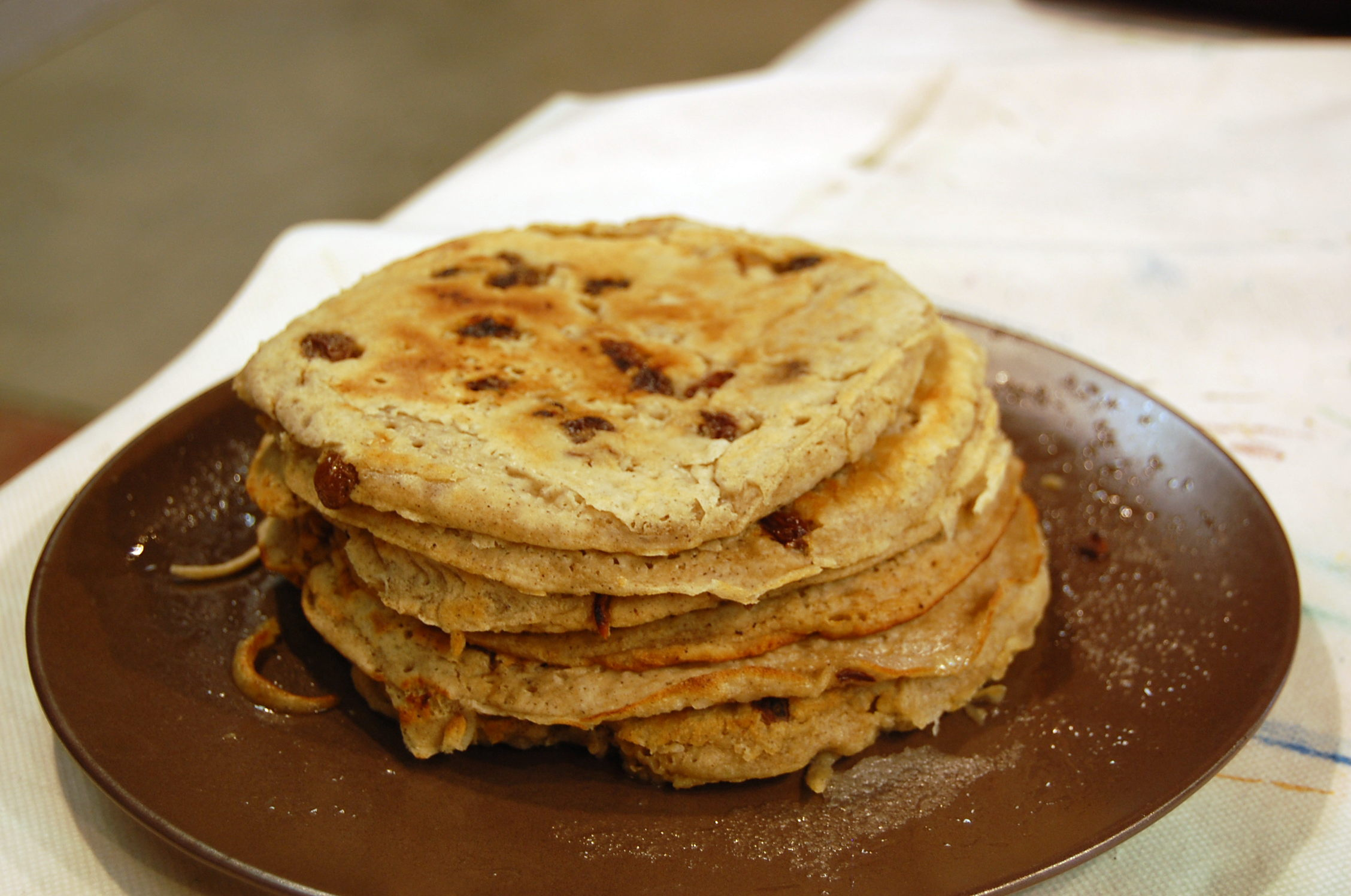
- Alternative names: Bouquette
- Type: Pancake
- Place of origin: Belgium
- Region or state: Liège
- Serving temperature: Hot or cold
- Main ingredients: Buckwheat flour, raisins, lard

A boûkète (Walloon; also spelled bouquette in French) is a type of Belgian pancake made with buckwheat flour, pan-fried in lard and frequently embellished with raisins. Boûkètes may be eaten hot or cold, garnished with a local brown sugar known as cassonade or with sirop de Liège.

The name derives from the Dutch-language word boekweit ("buckwheat") and is attested with that meaning in the early 17th century, before being used to refer to the pancake itself: a usage first recorded in 1743. The original name for pancake in Wallonia is "vôte", but now boûkète is used to describe this specific type of pancake.

Bo(u)quettes were first introduced to the city of Liège in the 18th century, imported by the court of the Prince-Bishops from the County of Loon and the district around Tongeren in Flanders. By the end of the 19th century the pancakes had become a Liège speciality.

Boûkètes are traditionally eaten accompanied by mulled wine during the Christmas season, and are also honoured at the festival of the "Free Republic of Outre-Meuse" held in Liège on 15 August each year.

== See also ==
- List of pancakes

== Bibliography ==
- Maurice Piron, « À propose de l'introduction de la boukète à Liège », in revue La Vie Wallonne, n° 21, 1947
- Roger Pinon, « La boûkète liégeoise et les crêpes à la farine de sarrasin en Wallonie », in La Vie Wallonne, n° 52, 1978
