= Aubel =

Municipality in Liège Province, Wallonia, Belgium

Aubel Åbe (Walloon)
- Municipality
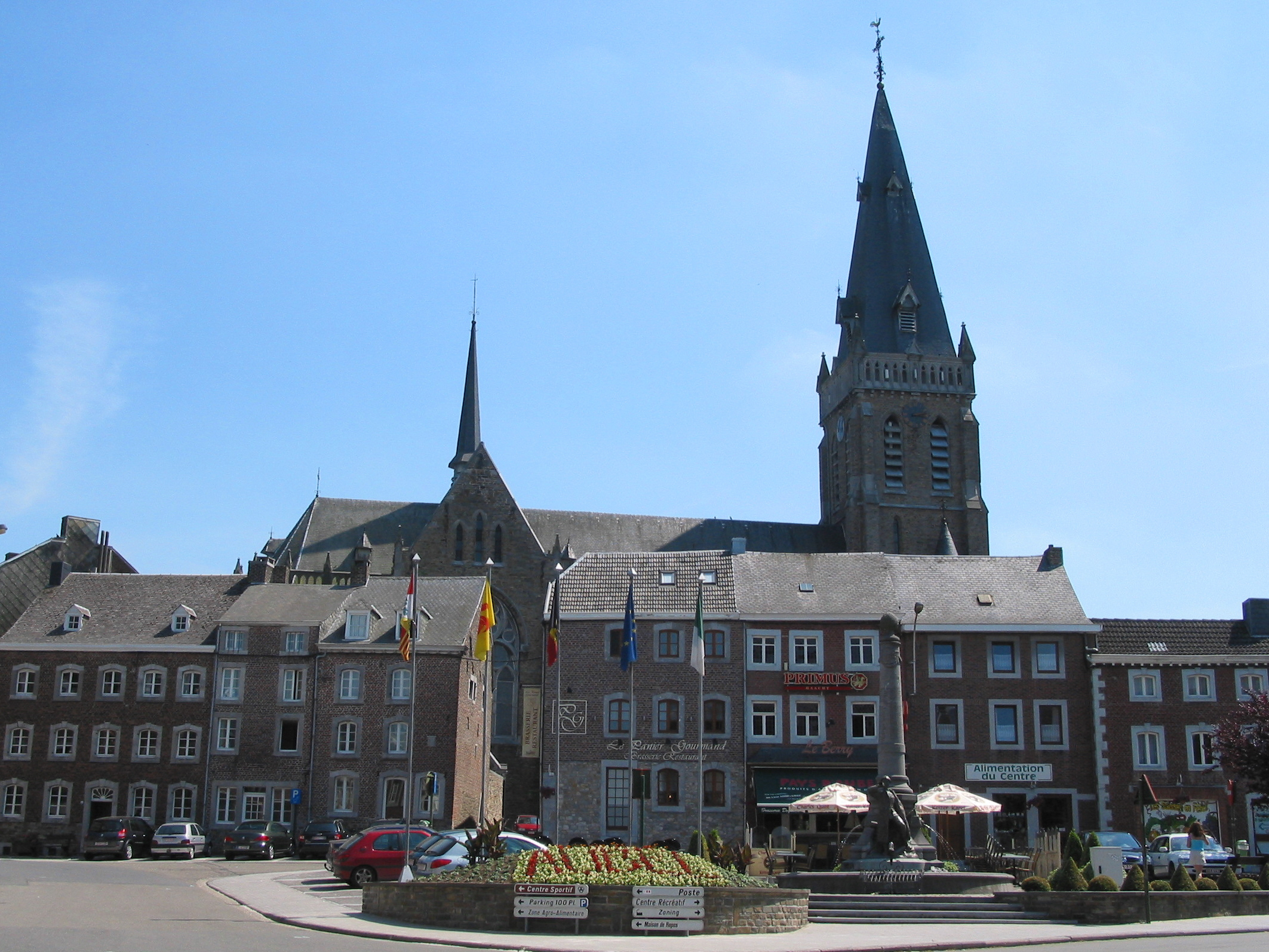
- The centre of Aubel

- Flag Coat of arms

- Location of Aubel in the province of Liège
- Interactive map of Aubel
- Location in Belgium
- Coordinates: 50°42′N 05°51′E
- Country: Belgium
- Community: French Community
- Region: Wallonia
- Province: Liège
- Arrondissement: Verviers

Government
  - Mayor: Freddy Lejeune (MR, Aubel Demain)
  - Governing party: Aubel Demain

Area
  - Total: 18.85 km^{2} (7.28 sq mi)

Population (2018-01-01)
  - Total: 4,221
  - Density: 223.9/km^{2} (580.0/sq mi)
- Postal codes: 4880
- NIS code: 63003
- Area codes: 087
- Website: www.aubel.be

Aubel (French pronunciation: [obɛl]; Walloon: Åbe) is a municipality of Wallonia located in the province of Liège, Belgium.

On 1 January 2006 the municipality had 4,082 inhabitants. The total area is 18.83 km^{2}, giving a population density of 217 inhabitants per km^{2}.

The Val-Dieu Abbey is located in the municipality, as is the Siroperie Meurens maker of sirop de Liège.

== Market ==
Aubel is famous for its regional products, these include: cheese, syrup, cider and beer. The market is active on Tuesdays and Sundays. It was very famous in the past and has been continually active since 1630. In the past, people came from far away to sell and buy products.

Especially the cheese from Aubel is very famous. It is protected as a Herve cheese by a European qualification.

== Twin/Sister Towns ==
- Vernantes, France

== Gallery ==
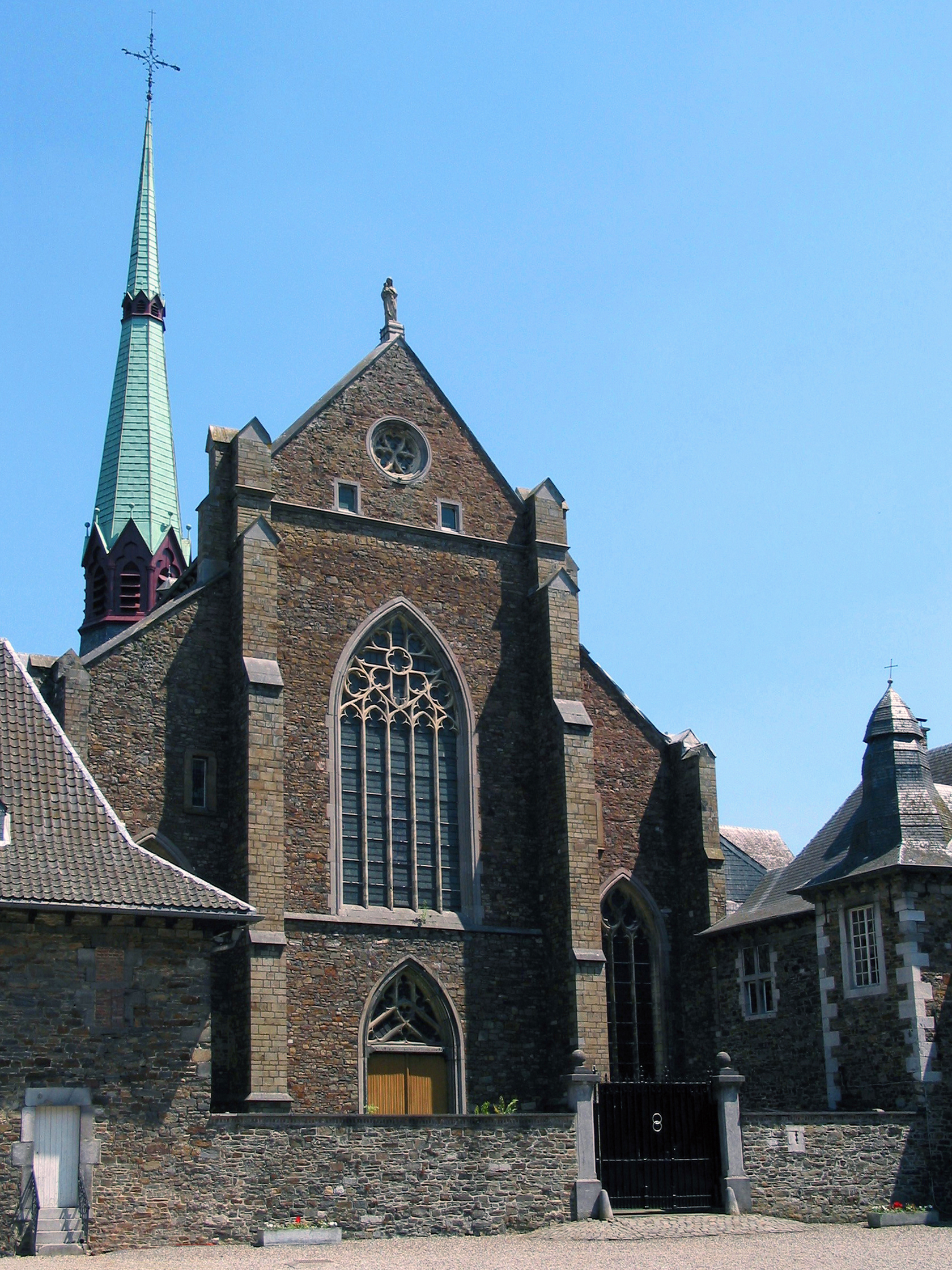
Val-Dieu Abbey

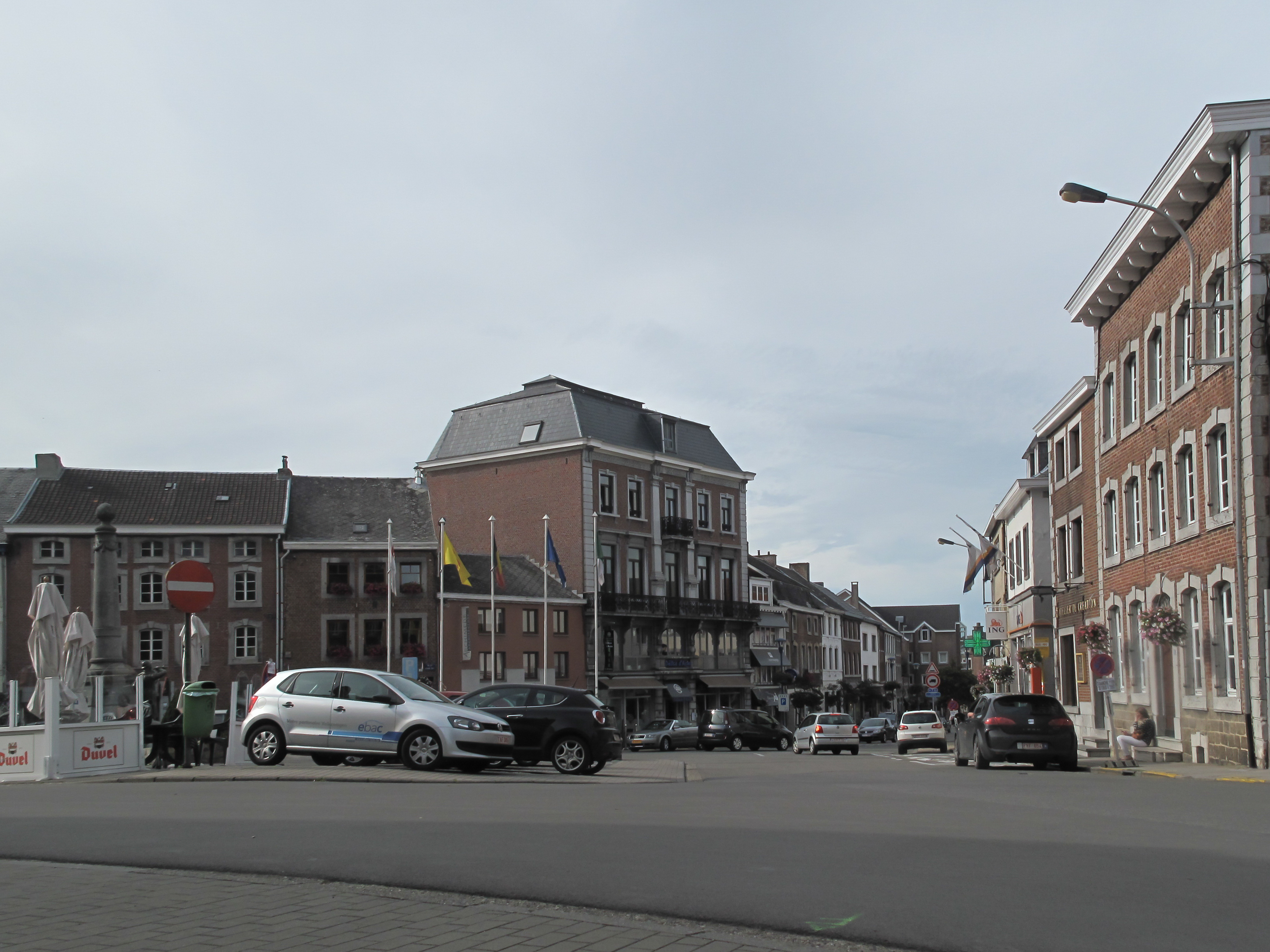
Aubel, view to the street

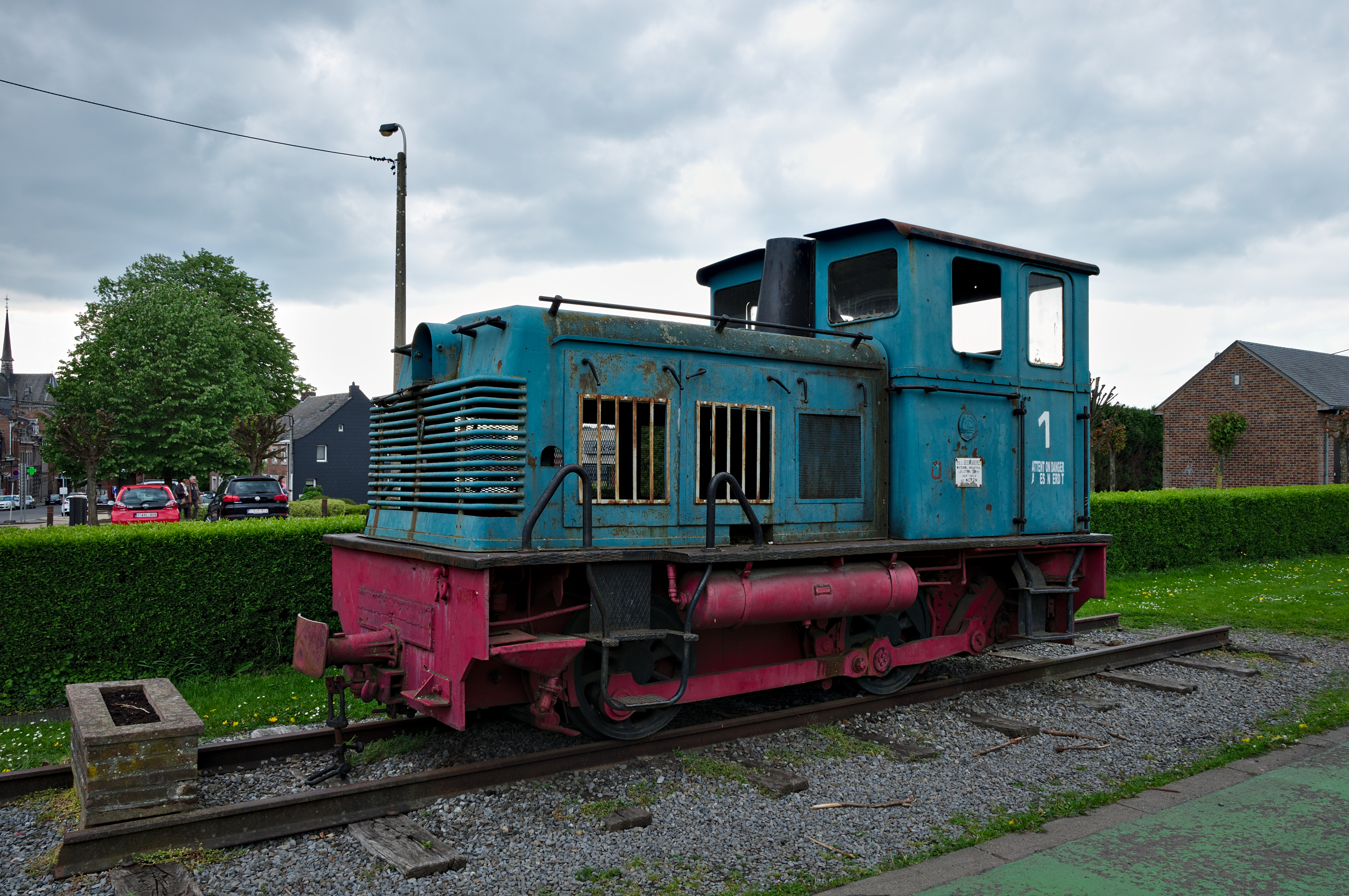
The Locomotive

== See also ==
- List of protected heritage sites in Aubel
