= Boulets à la Liégeoise =

Belgian dish

Boulet à la liégeoise
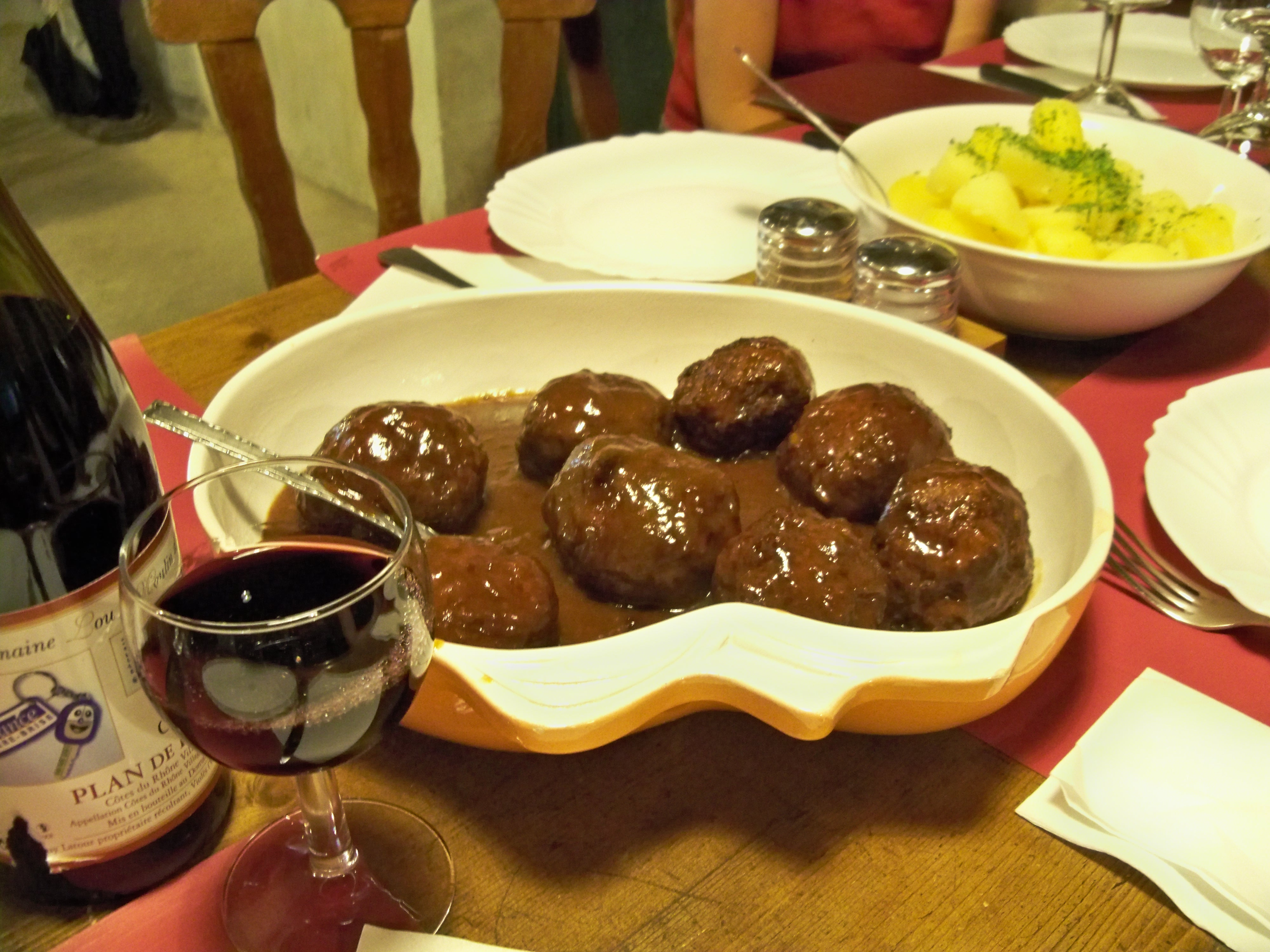
- Course: Main
- Place of origin: Belgium
- Created by: Géraldine Lapin
- Main ingredients: Ground meat, bread crumbs, onion

The boulet à la liégeoise (French pronunciation: [bulɛ a la ljeʒwaz]; or more regionally called boulet sauce lapin, boulet (sauce) chasseur, or Boulets) is a Belgian dish made from balls of mixed minced pork and beef in a sauce containing Liège syrup. As its name indicates, the dish comes from the city of Liège in Wallonia.

== Description ==
As with most regional recipes, each cook will have a slightly different variation on how to make the dish. Traditionally, boulet à la liégeoise consists of one or two big meatballs (the size of the ball allows one to differentiate a boulet from the smaller boulette), made from pork and veal or pork and beef minced meat, bread crumbs, onions and parsley. The balls are then cooked in a pan until golden brown before lowering the heat and letting the meat simmer in a sauce made from onions, vinegar, brown sugar, Liège syrup and Corinthian raisins. The sauce is called sauce lapin (literally "rabbit sauce"), not because of any rabbit in the sauce but after Madame Géraldine Lapin, born Corthouts, wife of Ernest Lapin (1868–1922), a tax collector in the suburbs of Liège.

A true institution in brasseries and friteries throughout Liège, and known nationwide, this dish is traditionally served with French fries (it is then called boulets-frites), mayonnaise, and lightly seasoned crudités or apple sauce.

Many establishments in Liège serve this dish as almost their only speciality. Most restaurants and friteries in Liège serve it. One company makes it industrially.

== The Gay Boulet Brotherhood and the Diamond Boulet ==
Since 23 March 1996 the Gay Boulet Brotherhood has awarded a Diamond Boulet to a restaurateur whose recipe is closest to the local tradition.

This award was given,

- in 1997, to the restaurant Le Bouche à Oreille, in Boncelles
- in 1998, to Friterie des Moges, in Rotheux
- in 1999, to the brasserie Le Lulay Al Copète, in Liège
- in 2000, to the restaurant Le Bouche à Oreille, in Boncelles
- in 2001, no award
- in 2002, to the restaurant La Liégeoise (chez René), in Ans
- in 2003, to Café Lequet (Chez Stockis), in Liège
- in 2004, to Café Lequet (Chez Stockis), in Liège
- in 2005, to the restaurant Le Dernier Ragot, rue des Clarisses à Liège
- in 2006, to Dernier Ragot, Clarisses street in Liège
- in 2007, to the restaurant Le Vin sur Vin, place du Marché in Liège
- in 2008, to the brasserie Au Point de vue, place Verte in Liège
- in 2009, to the friterie Chez Adam, place Reine Astrid in Visé
- in 2010, to the friterie Chez Adam, place Reine Astrid in Visé, tied with L'Amirauté, quai de l'Ourthe in Tilff
- in 2011, to the restaurant Chez Philippe, Haute-Sauvenière street in Liège
- in 2012, to Friterie du Longdoz, place Sylvain Dupuis 7 in Liège
- in 2013, to the restaurant Chez Pol, route du Condroz 123 in Nandrin
- in 2014, to the brasserie Le Saint-Grégory, Feronstrée 112 in Liège
- in 2015, to the brasserie Au Point de vue, place Verte 20 in Liège
- in 2016, to the brasserie Rive Droite, Esplanade 2 in Chaudfontaine
- in 2017, to the restaurant Aux Chandelles, route de Herve 187 in Grivegnée

== See also ==
- Wallonia
