= Moelingen =

Moelingen Mouland
- Village
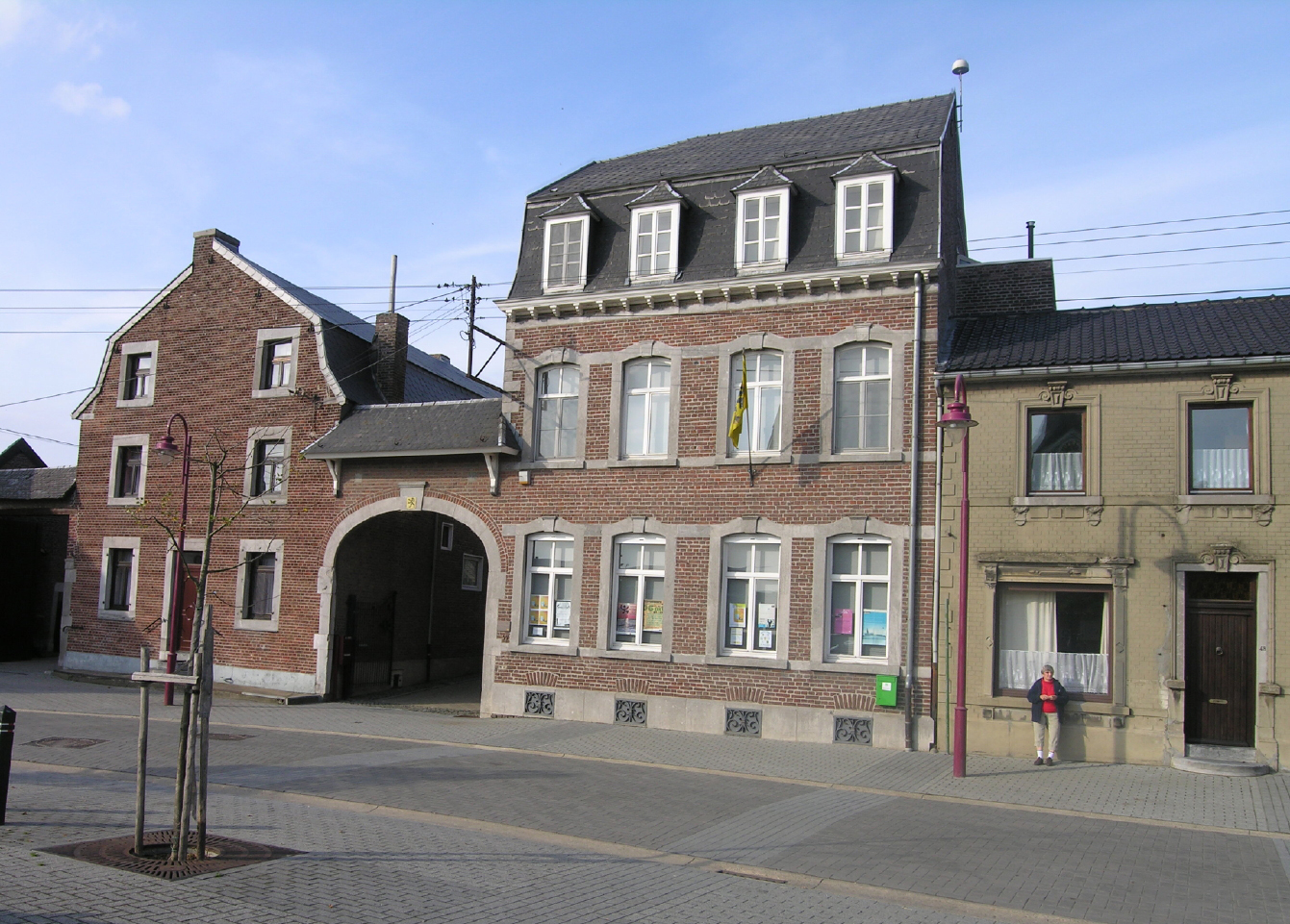
- Stylish buildings in Moelingen

- Location in Belgium
- Coordinates: 50°45′26″N 05°42′43″E
- Country: Belgium
- Community: Flemish Community
- Province: Limburg
- Municipality: Voeren

Area
  - Total: 3.30 km^{2} (1.27 sq mi)

Population (1970)
  - Total: 896
  - Density: 272/km^{2} (703/sq mi)
- Time zone: CET

Moelingen (French name Mouland) is a village in the municipality of Voeren, which is part of the province of Limburg in Belgium.

Until 1977 Moelingen was a municipality of its own. In that year it became part of the Voeren municipality.

In this village, like in all of the Belgian (as well as the neighbouring Dutch) province of Limburg, predominantly "Limburgs" is spoken, a Low Frankish dialect, closely related to Flemish.

== Geography ==
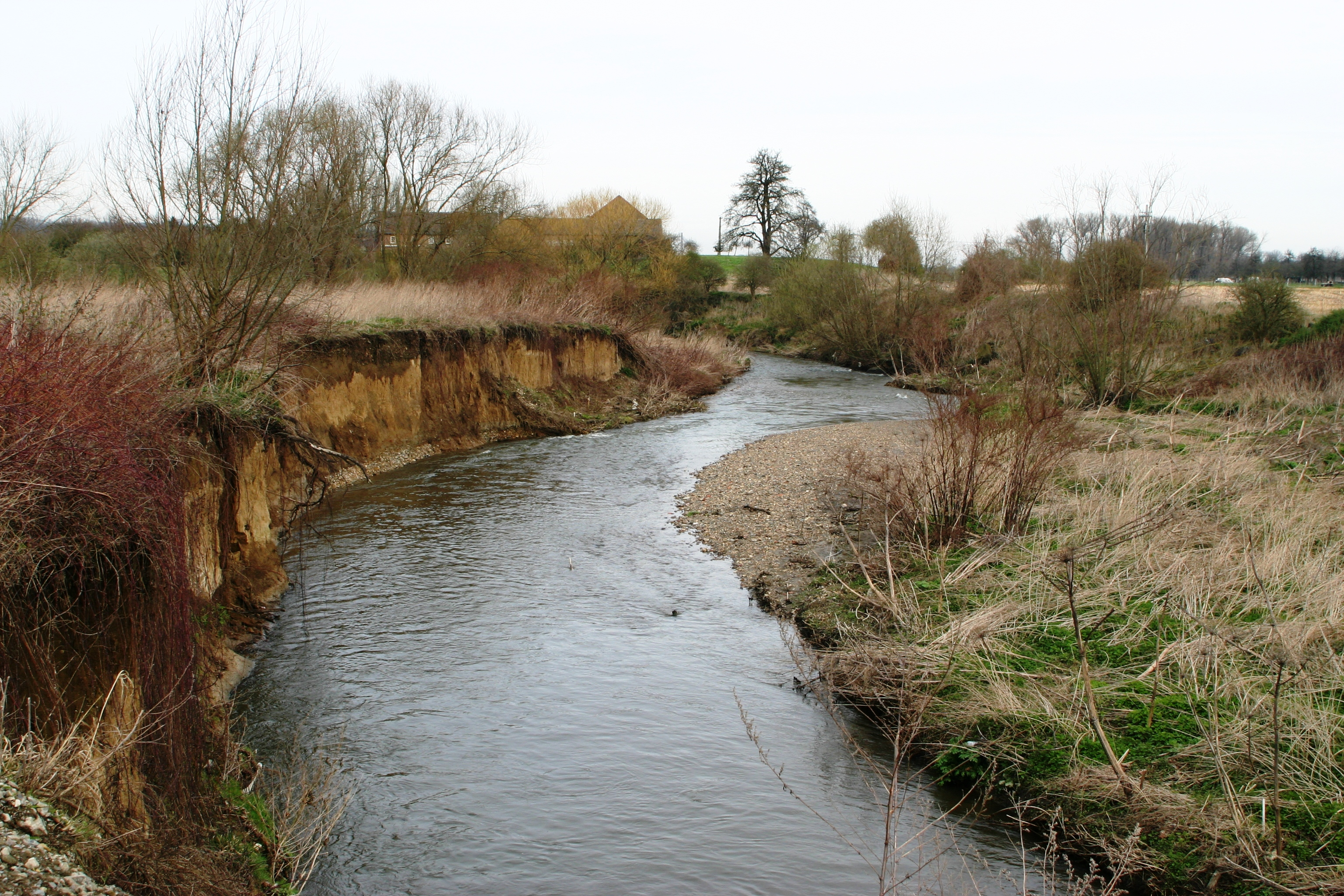
Berwinne river, some 50 meters from the place where it flows into the Meuse river

Moelingen is the westernmost of the six villages that together form the Voeren municipality

It is located in the valley of the Meuse river and on the river Berwinne (Berwijn), which, a little further westward, flows into the Meuse.

Further westward, across the Meuse river, the southern end of the Caestert Plateau (part of the Mount Saint Peter) is situated, as well as the village of Lieze (in French "Lixhe"), which is part of the Wallonian Wezet (in French "Visé") municipality.

On its north side, Moelingen abuts the Belgian border with the Netherlands, just south of Withuis, a hamlet in the Dutch municipality of Eijsden-Margraten. Withuis is partly situated on the Belgian side of the border, so that it once partly belonged to the former municipality of Moelingen and by now partly belongs to the municipality of Voeren.

Also on its west and its east side Moelingen more or less abuts the Belgian border with the Netherlands, as it is situated in a peak in this border. As a result, on its northeast side its neighbouring place is Mesch, an ancient village in the municipality of Eijsden-Margraten.

Further on its east side (behind the frontier heading northwards again) its neighbouring place is Gravenvoeren, more or less the main village of the Voeren municipality.

To the south Moelingen is bordering the municipality of Visé.

== Sights ==
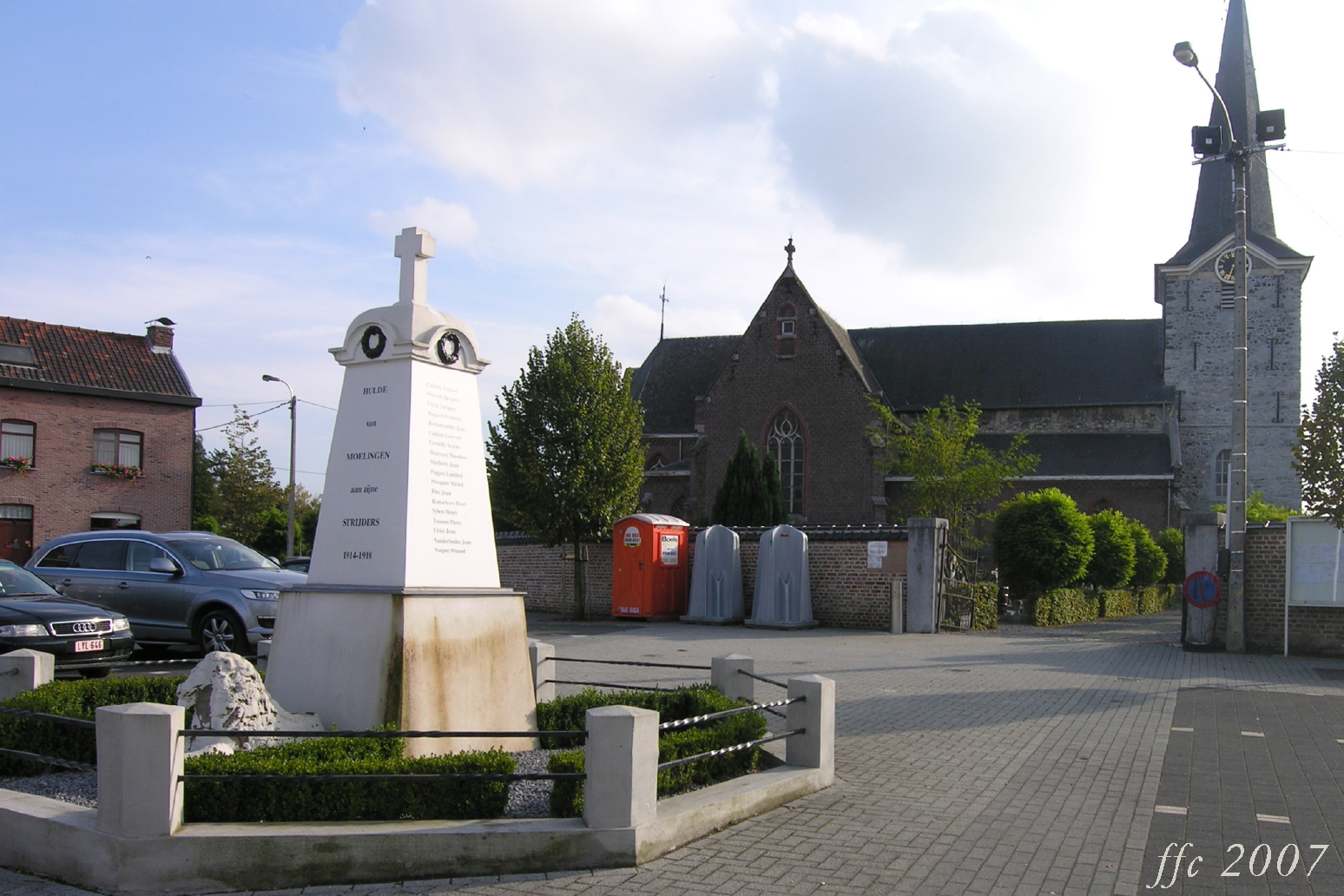
Our-Lady-In-Heaven Church and square

- Our-Lady-In-Heaven Church in Moelingen has a 14th-century Gothic nave and a Romanesque tower from the 12th century, but the stucco vaults were the result of reconstruction in 1715.
- The old bridge across the Berwinne was built in 1768.

== History ==
Moelingen was formerly part of Dalham County (Graafschap Dalhem), once an independent principality, but after 1239 a county under the Duchy of Brabant.

The village was largely destroyed in 1914 during the German invasion of World War I. When it was rebuilt after the war, the streets were widened and the plaza enlarged.

Until World War II the village was mainly agricultural, but since then it has become increasingly urban.

== Originating from Moelingen ==
- Léon Semmeling (1940–2024), football player and coach

=== Otherwise related ===
- Marcel Kerff, (Maartensvoeren, 1866 - Moelingen, 1914) cyclist; (later on hung by invading Germans during World War I. There is a monument in Moelingen to him and all Belgian cyclists who died in that war).
