= Val-Dieu Abbey =

Monastery in Belgium

Coordinates: 50°41′53″N 5°48′18″E

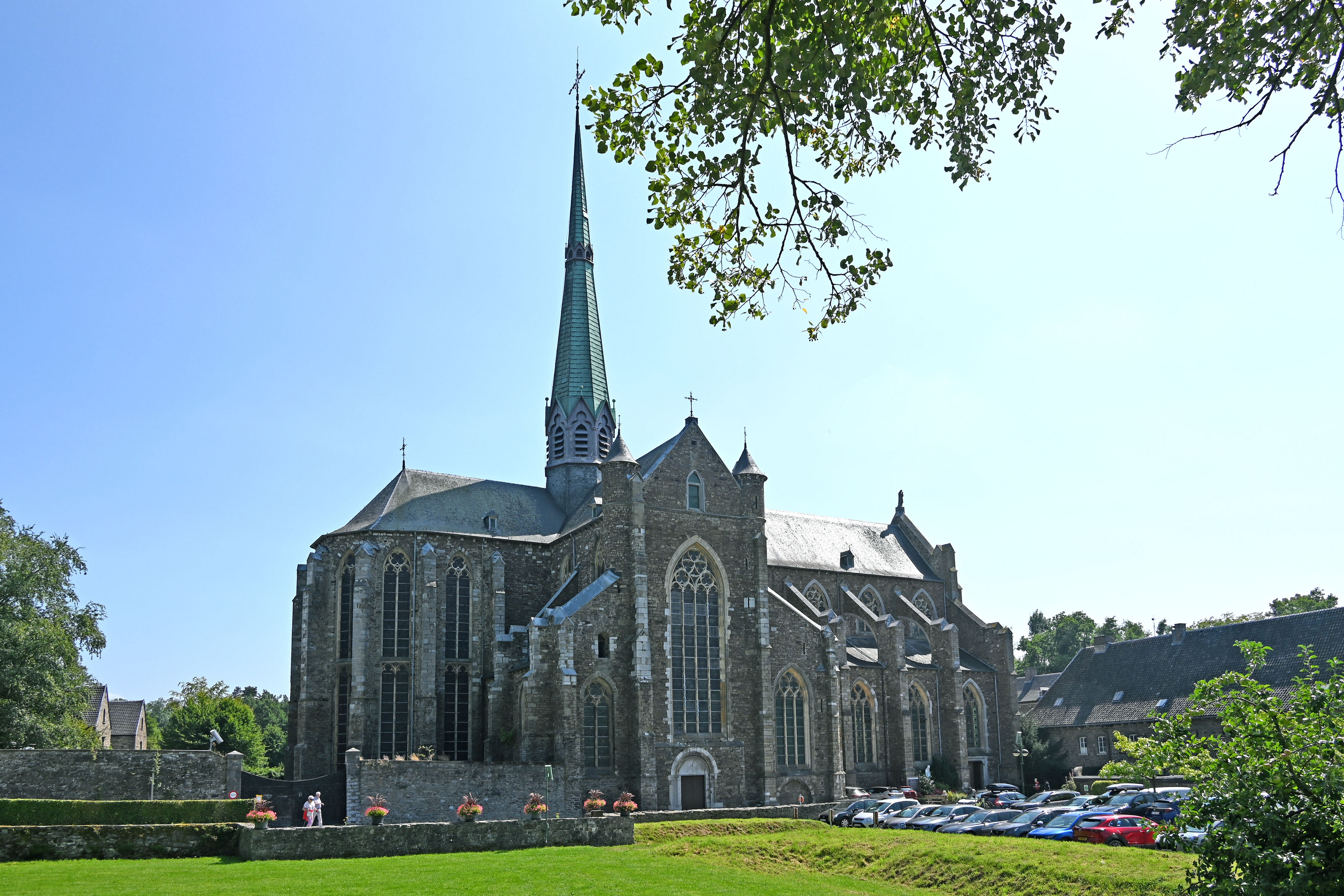
The abbey church

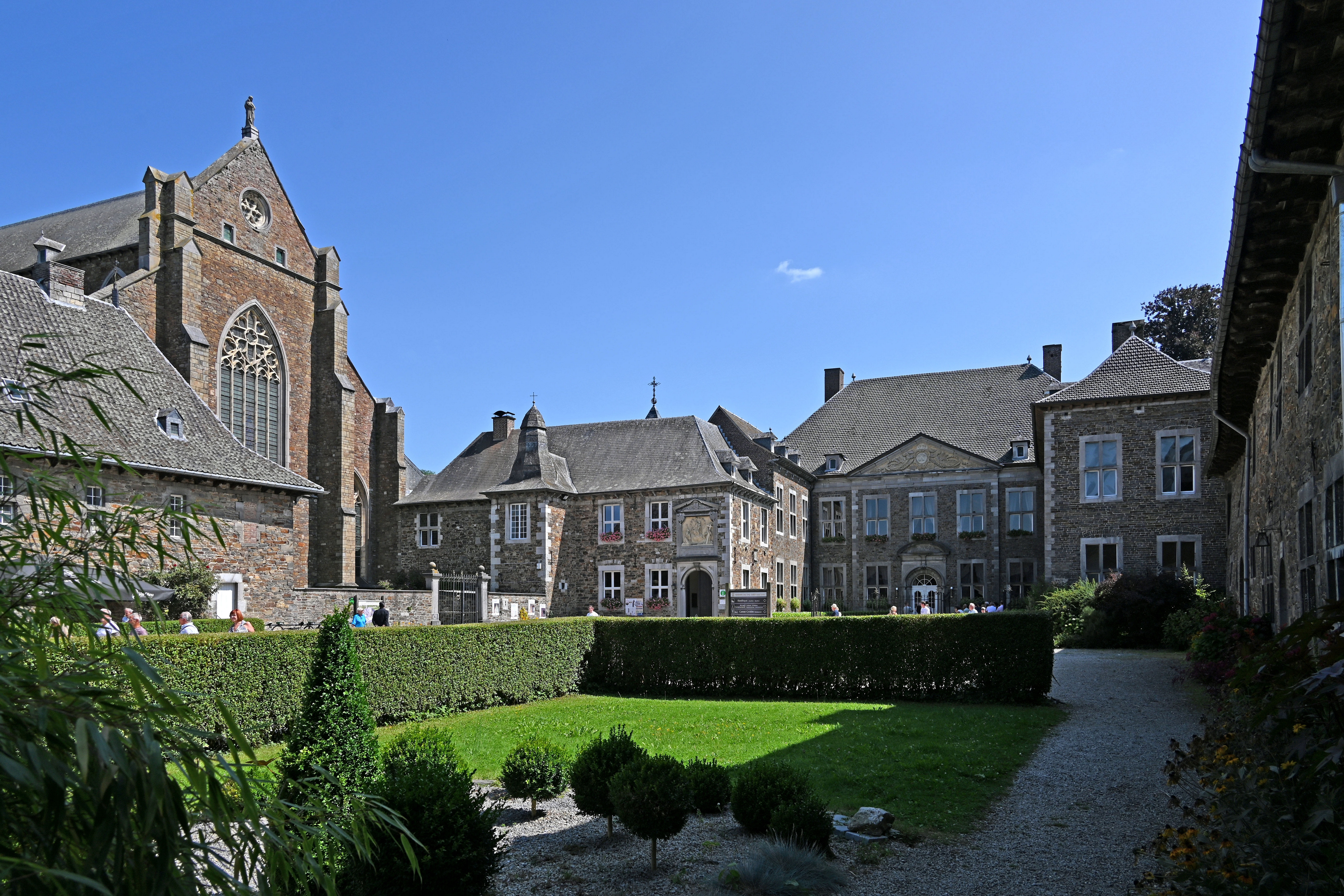
Val-Dieu Abbey

Val-Dieu Abbey is a former Cistercian monastery in Wallonia in the Berwinne valley near Aubel in the Pays de Herve (province of Liège, Belgium).

== History ==
In 1216 a small number of monks from Hocht Abbey in Lanaken, near Maastricht, settled in the uninhabited valley which formed the border between the Duchy of Limburg and the county of Dalhem; they called their settlement Vallis Dei (French: Val-Dieu; Valley of God).

The abbey's original church was destroyed in 1287 during the War of the Limburg Succession. The church was rebuilt, but was destroyed again in 1574 during the Eighty Years' War, and in 1683 by the armies of Louis XIV. Under the jurisdiction of Abbot Jean Dubois, from 1711 until 1749, the abbey flourished. It was dissolved during the French Revolution, when the church was destroyed for the fourth time.

The remaining buildings were left empty until 1844, when they were resettled by the last living monk of Val-Dieu from the time before the Revolution, together with four monks from Bornem Abbey.

The abbey was closed again in 2001, when the last three monks left. Since 1 January 2002 a small lay community has lived there, under the leadership of rector Jean-Pierre Schenkelaars, overseen by the regional ecclesiastical authorities, in association with the Cistercian Order.

== Brewery ==
In 1997 the Brasserie de l'Abbaye du Val-Dieu was established in the abbey farm, and brews a range of abbey beers in the tradition of the former Val-Dieu monks. Their range includes a Belgian blonde (6%), brune (8%), triple (9%), as well as a grand cru (10.5%).
