= Nièr beurre =

Preserve of apples that is part of the cuisine and culture of Jersey

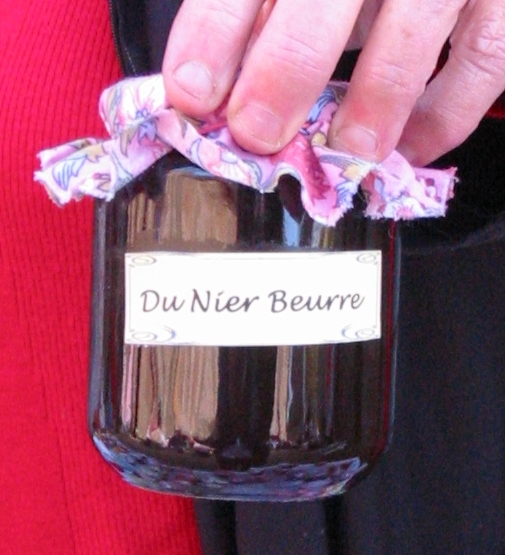
- A jar of nièr beurre
- Type: Apple butter
- Region or state: Jersey
- Main ingredients: Apples
- Ingredients generally used: Cider

Nièr beurre ("black butter" in Jèrriais) is a type of apple butter, a preserve of apples, that is part of the cuisine and culture of Jersey.

Nièr beurre is made of apples cooked in cider. The cider is reduced to a syrup before the apples are added. After some hours of cooking, sugar is added and the mixture seasoned with lemons, liquorice and allspice.

== See also ==
- List of spreads
