= Lacquemant waffles =

Culinary specialty from Liège, Belgium

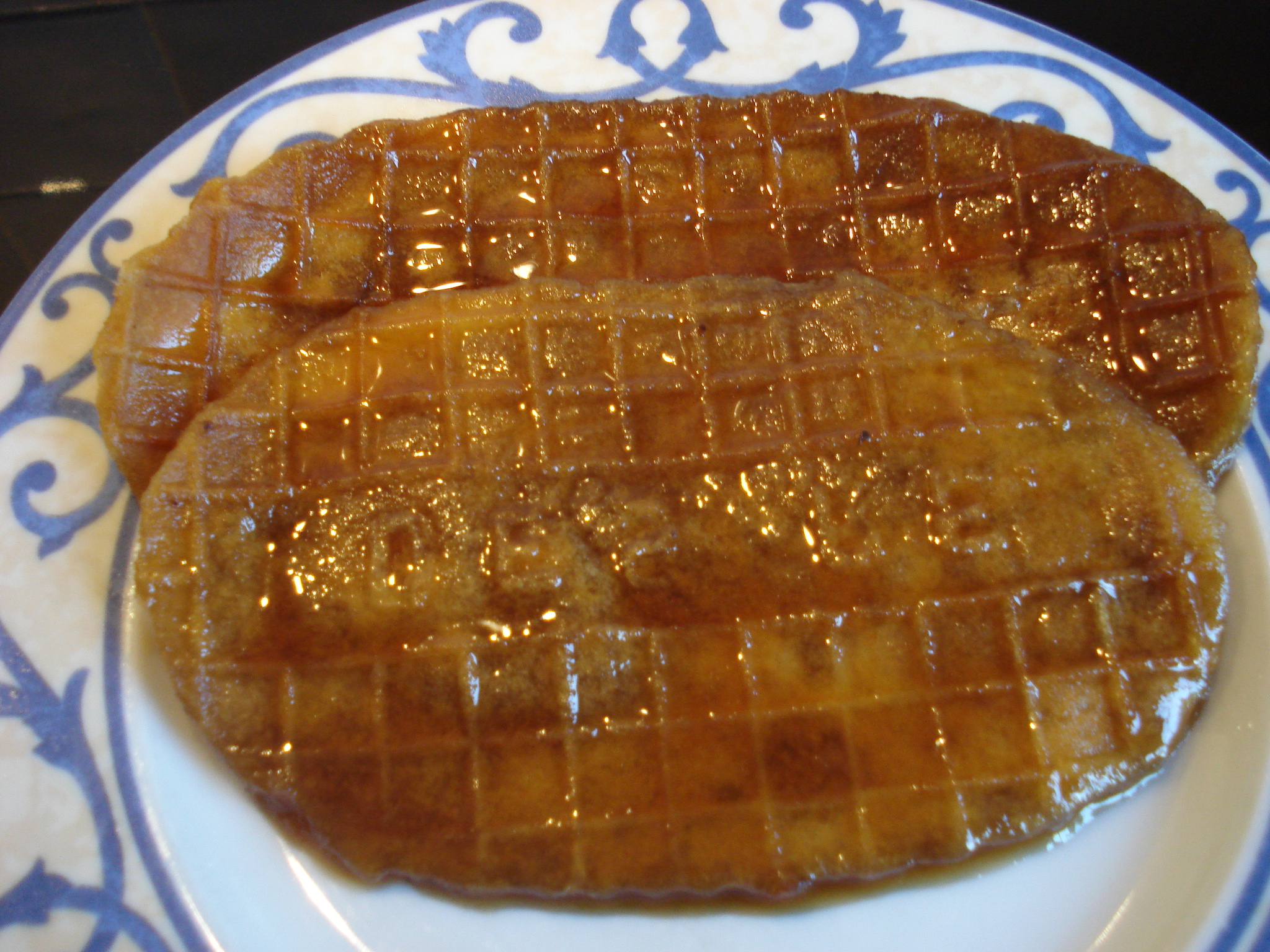

A lacquemant is a culinary specialty from the region of Liège, although it was created by Désiré Smidts at the Antwerp Fair, called Sinksenfoor (“Sinksen” is Pentecost in the Antwerpian dialect) where it is still eaten a lot. It is commonly eaten during the October fair in Liège.

It is a thin wafer, made from wheat, cut in two horizontally, filled and coated with sugar candy syrup flavoured with orange blossom.

== Making ==
Make a consistent dough with the ingredients and let it rise twice. Make pieces of dough of 20 gr and press it out to 10 cm. Bake it in a waffle iron for thin waffles. Cut it immediately and horizontally then fill it with syrup.

== Consumption ==
A lacquemant can be sold individually. Then, it is served in a cone whose lower part was folded in order to collect the syrup. However, lacquemants are more often sold by boxes of 6. It can be savored at home after being reheated a little in the microwave if it needs to.

== See also ==
- Belgian waffle
