= Apple butter =

Concentrated form of apple sauce

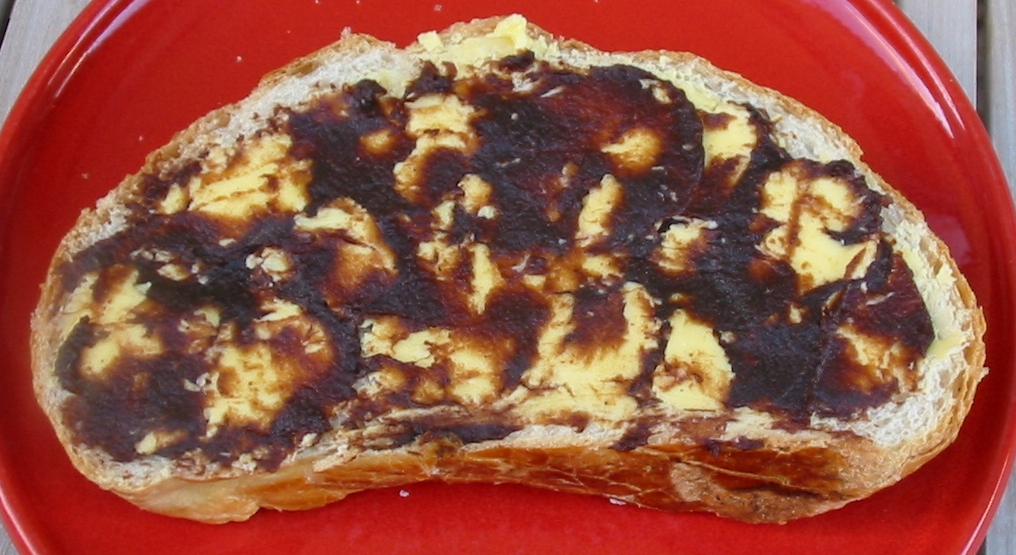
- Apple butter on a slice of buttered bread
- Type: Spread
- Place of origin: Belgium, Netherlands, and Germany
- Main ingredients: Apples, cider or water

Apple butter (Dutch: appelstroop) is a highly concentrated form of apple sauce produced by long, slow cooking of apples with apple juice or water to a point where the sugar in the apples caramelizes, turning the apple butter a deep brown. The concentration of sugar gives apple butter a much longer shelf life as a preserve than apple sauce.

== Background ==
The roots of apple butter lie in Limburg (Belgium and the Netherlands) and Rhineland (Germany), conceived during the Middle Ages, when the first monasteries (with large orchards) appeared. The production of the butter was a perfect way to preserve part of the fruit production of the monasteries in that region, at a time when almost every village had its own apple-butter producers. The production of apple butter was also a popular way of using apples in colonial America, well into the 19th century.

The product contains no actual dairy butter; the term butter refers only to the butter-like thick, soft consistency, and apple butter's use as a spread for bread. Sometimes seasoned with cinnamon, clove, and other spices, apple butter is usually spread on bread, used as a side dish, an ingredient in baked goods, or as a condiment. Apple butter may also be used on sandwiches to add an interesting flavor, but is not as commonly used as in historical times.

Vinegar or lemon juice is sometimes mixed in while cooking to provide a small amount of tartness to the usually sweet apple butter. The Pennsylvania Dutch often includes apple butter as part of their traditional 'seven sweets and seven sours' dinner table array.

In areas of the American South, the production of apple butter is a family event, due to the large amount of labor necessary to produce apple butter in large quantities. Traditionally, apple butter was prepared in large copper kettles outside. Large paddles were used to stir the apples, and family members would take turns stirring. In Appalachian cuisine, apple butter was the only type of fruit preserve normally rendered into fruit leather.

In Europe, an apple butter is traditionally made which is closer to dense syrup, in the Netherlands (known as appelstroop, meaning apple syrup) and in Germany (known as Apfelkraut) and frequently eaten on bread with (or without) thinly sliced cheese and with Sauerbraten. A sweeter version, made using pears, as well as apples, is more popular in Belgium, where it is known as sirop de Liège. Other than in Benelux and the Rhineland, apple syrup is a minority taste in Western Europe (in Germany, outside of the Rhineland, it is generally sold in health food shops), and a similar food is produced in francophone Switzerland, where it is known as vin cuit.

Russian Пови́дло (from Czech povidla, or Polish powidła or powidło) is prepared by the reduction of fruit puree with some sugar and sometimes spices. The final product should contain no more than 34% of moisture and about 60% of sugar. The most popular one is made from apples, but povidlo is also made from apricots, cherries, prunes, pears, and cranberries. Polish powidła is made from fresh purple plums without the addition of sugar.

In Jersey, in the Channel Islands, apple butter is known as black butter or lé nièr beurre and includes liquorice as an ingredient. In Northern Ireland it is now produced under the name "Irish Black Butter" in Co. Armagh. The possibly apocryphal story is that it was Scots-Irish immigrants who introduced the recipe to the Appalachians.

In Japan, apple butter often contains actual butter and is considerably lighter in color, typically a shade of yellow. It is used as a spread on toast or as a filling in baked buns, and may have a mashed texture with small apple chunks, similar to the red bean paste filling used in anpan. It is produced in apple-growing regions such as Nagano and Aomori Prefectures and often uses local apple varieties such as Fuji.

Apple butter can be used as a fat substitute in reduced-fat or fat-free cooking, as well as vegan recipes.

== Production ==
=== Ingredients ===
- Apples (peeled, cored, and finely chopped)
- Brown (or white) sugar or unrefined sugar beet juice
- Apple juice (or apple cider)
- Spices (nutmeg, cloves, allspice, cardamom, vanilla extract and lemon juice – optional)

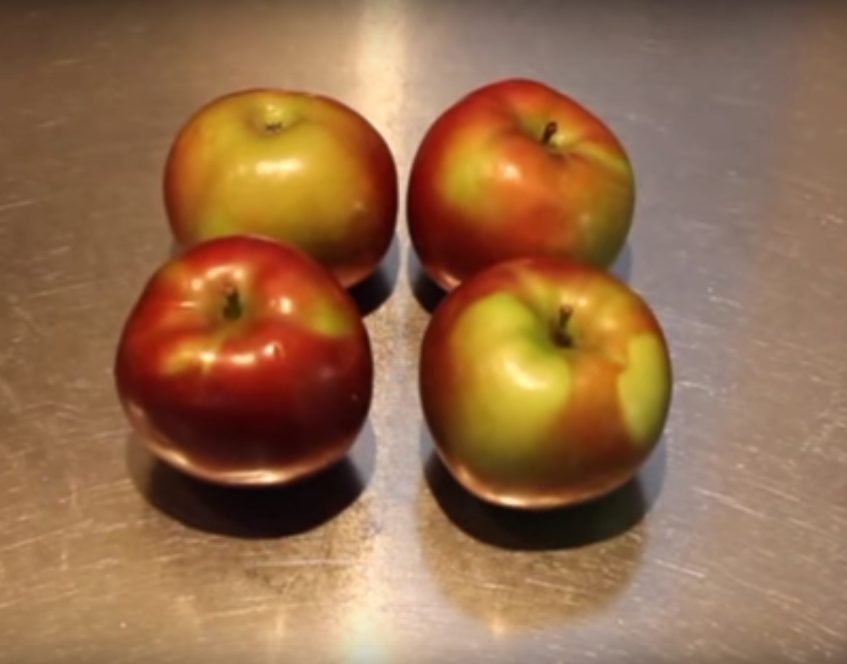
Soft apples are usually used to make apple butter.

==== Apples ====
Different types of apples can be used for the production of apple butter. Apples are chosen based on their physical and chemical properties – such as hardness, sweetness, acidity/tartness, etc. Soft apples are often chosen for the production of apple butter because they can be broken down more easily and faster when cooked. These types of apples include: McIntosh (soft, creamy), Cortland (soft, sweet-and-tart, all-purpose), Granny Smith (tartness sweetens upon cooking, ideal complement to savory and salty foods).

=== Manufacture ===
Apples are first selected based on ripeness, texture, natural sweetness and tartness/acidity. Some of these apples are pressed into fresh apple cider, while the rest are peeled and cored, then wholly steamed and cooked into apple puree. The freshly pressed apple cider and cooked apple puree are added to a large steam vat. Small amounts of sodium bicarbonate are added to the mixture in order to reduce acidity and help bring out sweetness from the natural fructose available in the apples. The mixture will then be boiled during the evaporation process, allowing the volume to reduce to one seventh. The end product will be a concentrated mixture used as apple butter.

== Packaging and storage ==
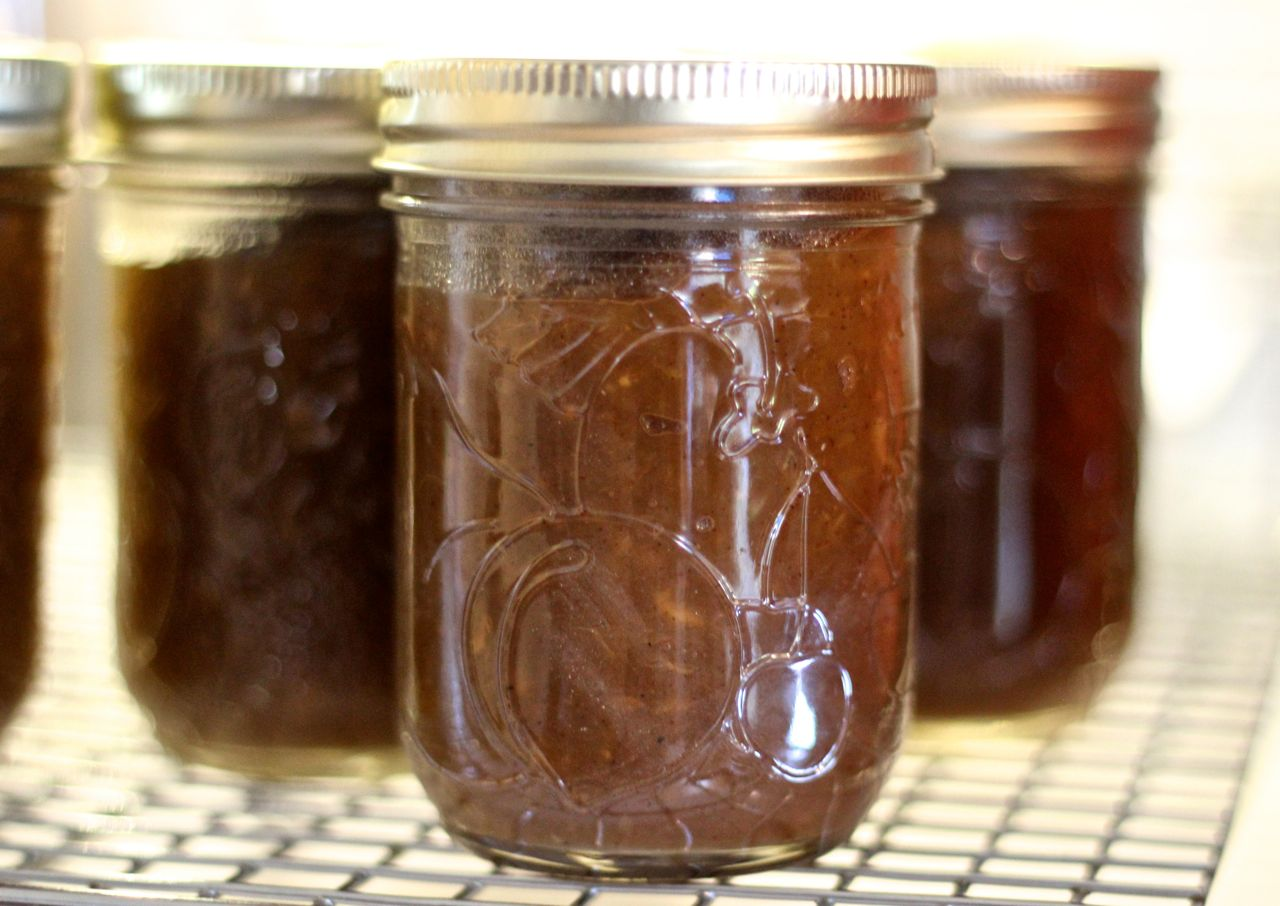
Apple butter packaged at home in jars

Apple butter is typically packaged in the same way whether it is prepared in a factory setting or made at home. It can be packaged mechanically in jars or cans through the use of machinery.

Apple butter is a product created as a means of preserving apples. Due to its high acidity, high sugar content and low amounts of free water, an opened package can be kept for months at room temperature without spoiling. Nevertheless, there are numerous methods that can be used for the storage of apple butter. No method is 100% dependable, as there is always a chance of the presence of bacteria or other microorganisms within the food itself, on the storage equipment or in the storage facility.

Typically, the jars are sterilized before packaging to ensure no harmful microorganisms or bacteria will infect the product, causing it to spoil. Ideally, jars are sterilized using a combination of high temperature heating and ensuring a tight seal.

Apples are a high acid food, with a pH below 4.6. Therefore, the apple butter can be placed in hot jars without chances of compromising quality of the product. The main sources of spoilage, molds, yeasts and enzymes, are killed at the temperatures reached in the hot water bath during the sterilization process for cans and jars. The spoilage microorganisms in acid foods can be destroyed in a small amount of time at temperatures below that of boiling water, so there is little risk of microorganisms appearing in the food product itself.

=== Freezing ===
Freezing jars of apple butter can help to maintain quality and inhibit bacterial growth. This storage method does not destroy pre-existing microorganisms that may be present in the product, so it is important to be wary when consuming previously frozen product.

=== Boiling ===
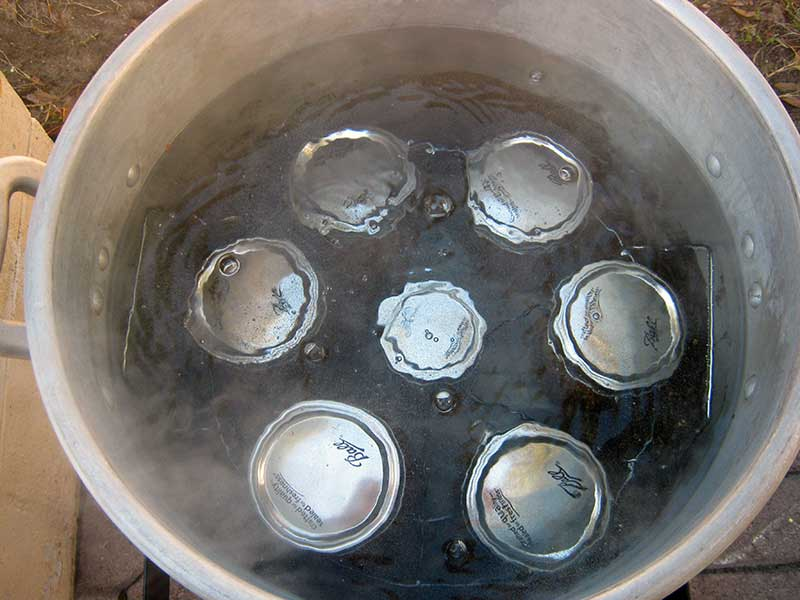
Boiling jars during the sterilization process

Applying high temperatures over a specified period of time can not only aid in the sterilization of the jars or cans used in packaging, but it can help maximize the storage time of the apple butter or other products. Boiling the jars will remove the oxygen remaining in the jar, which forms a tight seal between the lid and the rim. The heat used for this method of canning can be sufficient to kill bacterial cells found in the food. Only high-acid food with a pH of 4.6 or less can be processed using the boiling water bath method. This is because high-acid foods prevent the growth of spores of the bacterium Clostridium botulinum, which cannot be killed by boiling. Foods with a pH of more than 4.6 can allow the spores to grow.

=== Vacuum sealing ===
Similar to the boiling process, vacuum sealing jars or cans of apple butter can remove remaining oxygen in the jar, forming a tight seal. The vacuuming process can be done in both a large-scale factory manner or at home with a mechanical vacuum sealer. Special devices, such as a vacuum pack sealer, can be fitted with specific jar attachments to fit over the lid of a jar and create a secure fit.

=== Pressurization ===
Low-acid foods can be processed in a pressure canner to get rid of the risk of botulism; however, this treatment is not necessary for high-acid foods such as apple butter. Apple butter does not require sterilization at extremely high temperatures to reach optimum storage and maintain quality, so the pressure canning process is not typically used for this product.

=== Preservation and spoilage ===
The preservation of apple butter involves application of several food science concepts, including controlling the temperature, water activity, and level of acidity in the product. Thermal processing not only helps produce texture and flavor characteristic to apple butter but is also a common way of sterilizing food products. It is a critical step in minimizing the potential growth of spoilage-causing and illness-causing microorganisms in the product. As a result of thermal processing and the softening of the apples, the presence of air bubbles can be minimized during canning. Refrigeration is a way of preserving apple butter after thermal processing. Though it is not a method which eliminates microorganisms, it is a method to decrease the rate at which microorganisms grow. Opened jars of apple butter may last a year if kept under low-temperature conditions. With refrigeration, the quality of apple butter may still decrease over time.

Aside from controlling the temperature, regulation of the water activity in apple butter may also preserve the quality of apple butter. Water present in foods may exist in two types: bound water and free water. Bound water refers to water molecules that are attached to other molecules, making them unable to participate in chemical reactions or be utilized by microorganisms to contribute to their growth. Free water refers to water molecules free to perform the above functions, and should be decreased to achieve a longer preservation period. The addition of sugar to apple butter allows more binding with the free water molecules and thereby decreases the amount of free water to support microbial growth.

Lowering the pH level of apple butter may also help decrease the rate of spoilage. Acidity in foods creates a less favorable environment for the survival of microorganisms, thus inhibiting the growth of bacteria and molds. Foods that have a pH of less than 4.6 are considered high-acid foods, and apples in general have a pH of 3.7. Some recipes may include the addition of vinegar as a way to further bring down the pH and preserve the quality of the end product.

Sometimes, commercial brands of apple butter can be found with other ingredients and food additives. High fructose corn syrup is a preservative that has a high level of acidity and is often used by manufacturers in the preservation of food products, including apple butter. Sodium benzoate, an additive allowed under the Canadian food regulation, is capable of inhibiting the growth of fungi and has been used as a preservative in apple butter.

It is possible to observe spoilage in apple butter if the end product is not properly sterilized during the canning process, allowing microorganisms to survive and grow in the container. Lack of refrigeration may also speed up the rate of spoilage of apple butter. Slight deterioration in quality happens with time even if the product is refrigerated, and does not pose a threat to the consumer. Some indicators for change in quality include the change of color and smell. However, apple butter should be discarded if there are clear signs of spoilage, such as when mold is found on the product surface. Even prior to apple butter preparation, the quality of apples should be taken into consideration since it has been reported to correspond to the level of patulin, a type of toxin produced by molds, present in apples. Studies have also shown that a longer period of heat treatment can reduce the levels of patulin present in the product.

== Nutrition ==
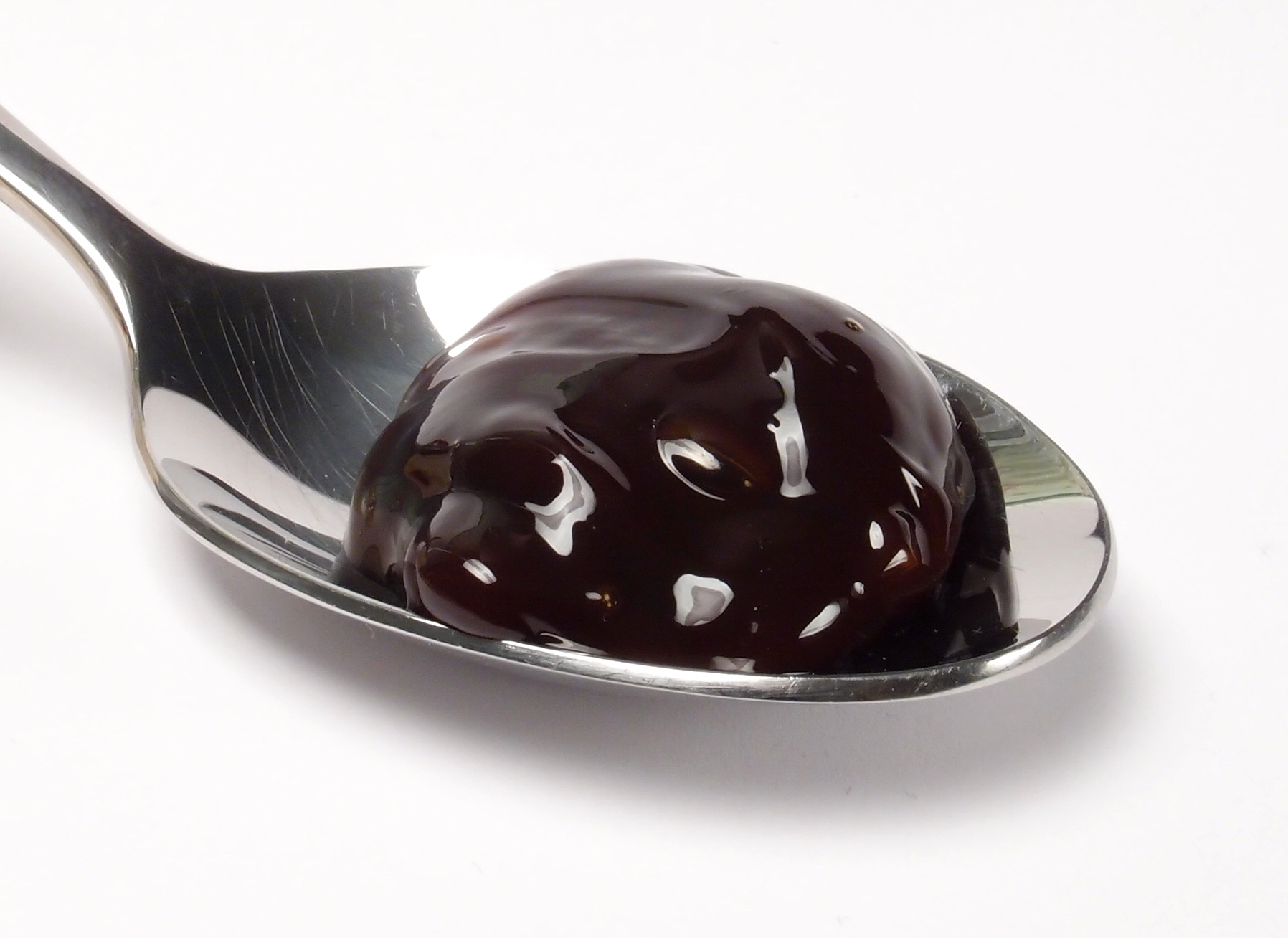
Apple butter on a spoon

The nutritional value of apple butter varies quite a bit based on the recipe used to prepare that particular product. The ingredient list can be as simple as just two ingredients to a much more complicated mixture of foods. Although the ingredients may vary, which changes the nutritional value of the apple butter, the two main things that stand out to consumers on the nutritional facts table are the amount of carbohydrates and the amount of sugar that the apple butter contains. For 1 tablespoon the amount of carbohydrates is about 4–15 grams and the sugar content is about 4–10 grams. Apple butter is not a good source for iron, calcium, vitamin A, vitamin B, though it contains a small amount of vitamin C. Although all the recipes vary, the main ingredients in all apple butters are apples and apple juice. In commercial brands of apple butter, the type of apples used is not specified, but in certain homemade recipes they specify what types of apples to use. Commercial brands tend to use corn syrup in their apple butter. In homemade apple butter, sugar or brown sugar are more frequently used. Apple butter may be a healthier choice of spread than other breakfast spreads, but would not be considered to be healthy, as it does not provide very many nutrients.

In the Netherlands, appelstroop is widely recognised as a good source of iron, a dietary element in which modern diets are frequently considered deficient. There is a widespread view that the iron content arises from the interaction of the acid in the apples with the metal of vessels in which the appelstroop is prepared and packaged. However, commercially sold appelstroop is often sold in paper- or plastic-based containers (or, in Germany, glass jars). Well into the fifties, the traditional cooking pots used for the preparation of appelstroop were generally of copper. Regardless of how appelstroop originally gained its reputation as a source of dietary iron, the iron content (10–20 mg per 100 g) in typical factory-produced product is boosted by the sugar beet, which is included with apples in the approximate ratio of 30:70. The cooking process thickens the texture of the sugar beet syrup, providing the extra sweetness which modern tastes expect (no refined sugar is added in these recipes) and increases the proportion of various mineral elements including the iron which is already present before cooking in both apples and sugar beet.

== Food-borne disease ==
Apple butter is at low risk for spreading food-borne disease. The way that apple butter is packaged is very similar to that of jams. Apple butter is stored in glass jars, which allow light to enter the container therefore their shelf-life is less than that of food canned in steel cans. The preservation technique used to preserve apple butter is called canning. Canning is a process where pre-packaged food is exposed to moist heat of at least 121 °C for a certain amount of time in order to kill microorganisms that cause spoilage and disease. Although apple butter is at low risk for food-borne disease, if canned improperly, especially when being made at home, the product may grow dangerous microorganisms. If the apple butter is improperly canned, Clostridium botulinum can survive and multiply in the jar. This germ produces a toxin that can seriously harm an individual or in some cases even cause death. Makers of apple butter need to verify that the jars are properly sealed and that the heat treatment is used on the jars of apple butter for a sufficient amount of time in order to kill all microorganisms and prevent the product from contamination through the air of the outside environment. Once the jar is unsealed, the product must be refrigerated to slow down or inhibit the growth of microorganisms that cause spoilage.

== Uses ==
Apple butter and apple sauce also have different uses. Popular ways of using apple butter include as a condiment or a spread for pastries and pie fillings. It is also a very popular spread for pancakes in the low countries. It can also be used as a healthier alternative for oil, shortening, or butter. Some people also enjoy using it to marinate meat, or pairing it with cooked meat and cheeses such as cheddar, brie or chevre. Apple sauce, in contrast, is usually served on its own or as a side dish for a variety of dishes.

=== Difference from apple sauce ===
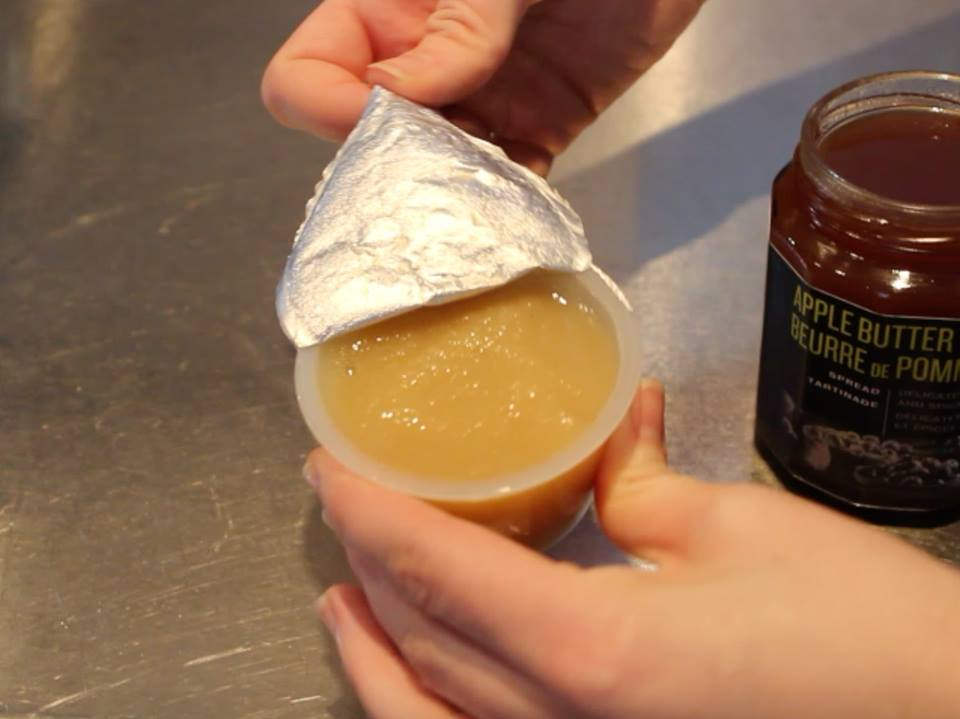
A comparison of apple sauce to apple butter. Apple sauce is much lighter in color and has a more liquid consistency.

During the preparation, apples are cored for apple sauces but not for apple butter, allowing it to have a much stronger apple taste. The two also differ in cooking time; apple sauce just needs to be cooked until the apples are soft enough to be pureed, while apple butter needs to be cooked until the apples brown, break down and thicken. As a result of its long cooking time, apple butter is a much darker, caramel brown color, while apple sauce is usually a lighter golden color. Apple sauce has a more liquid consistency while apple butter is thicker and is more spreadable.

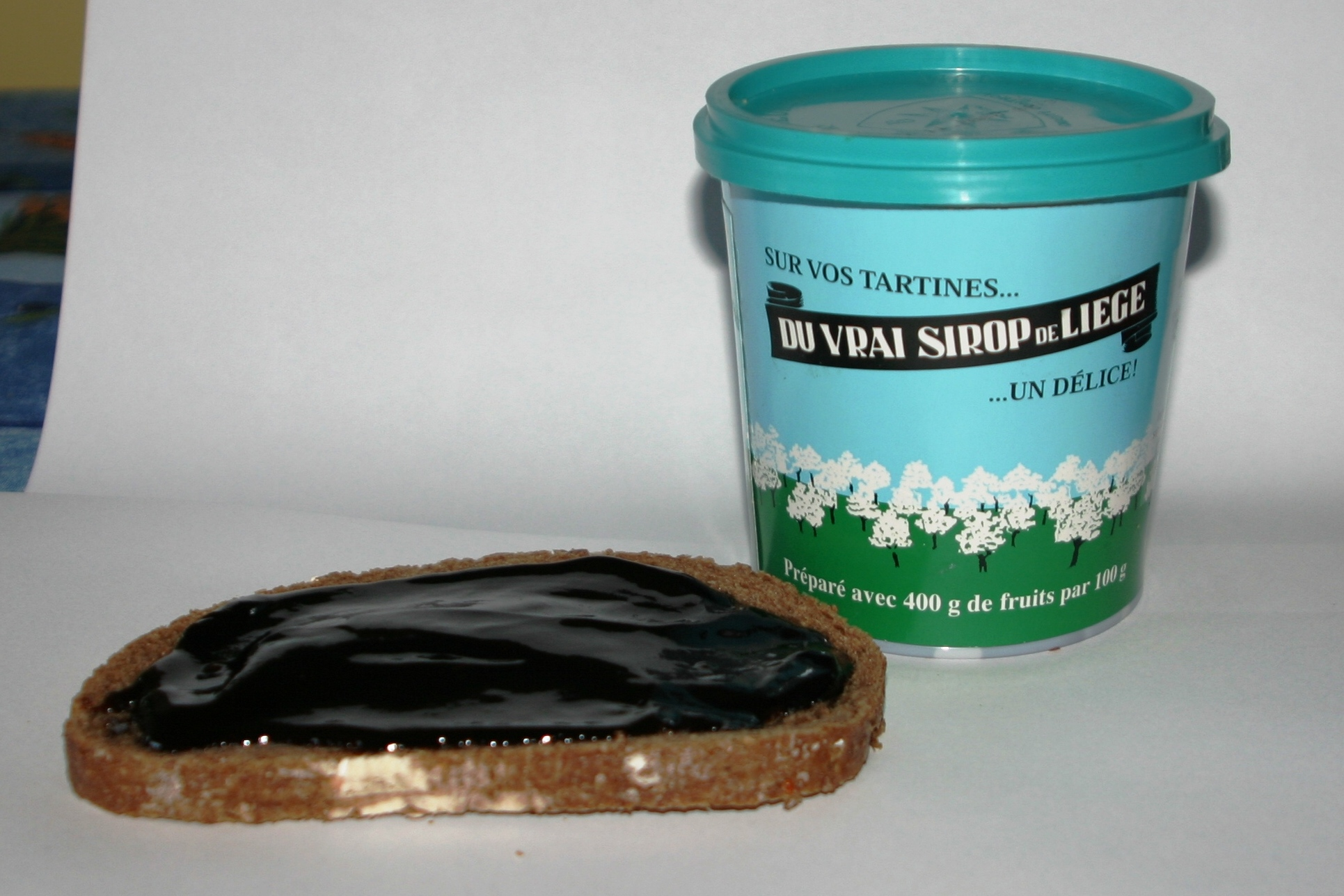
Sirop de Liège on a slice of bread

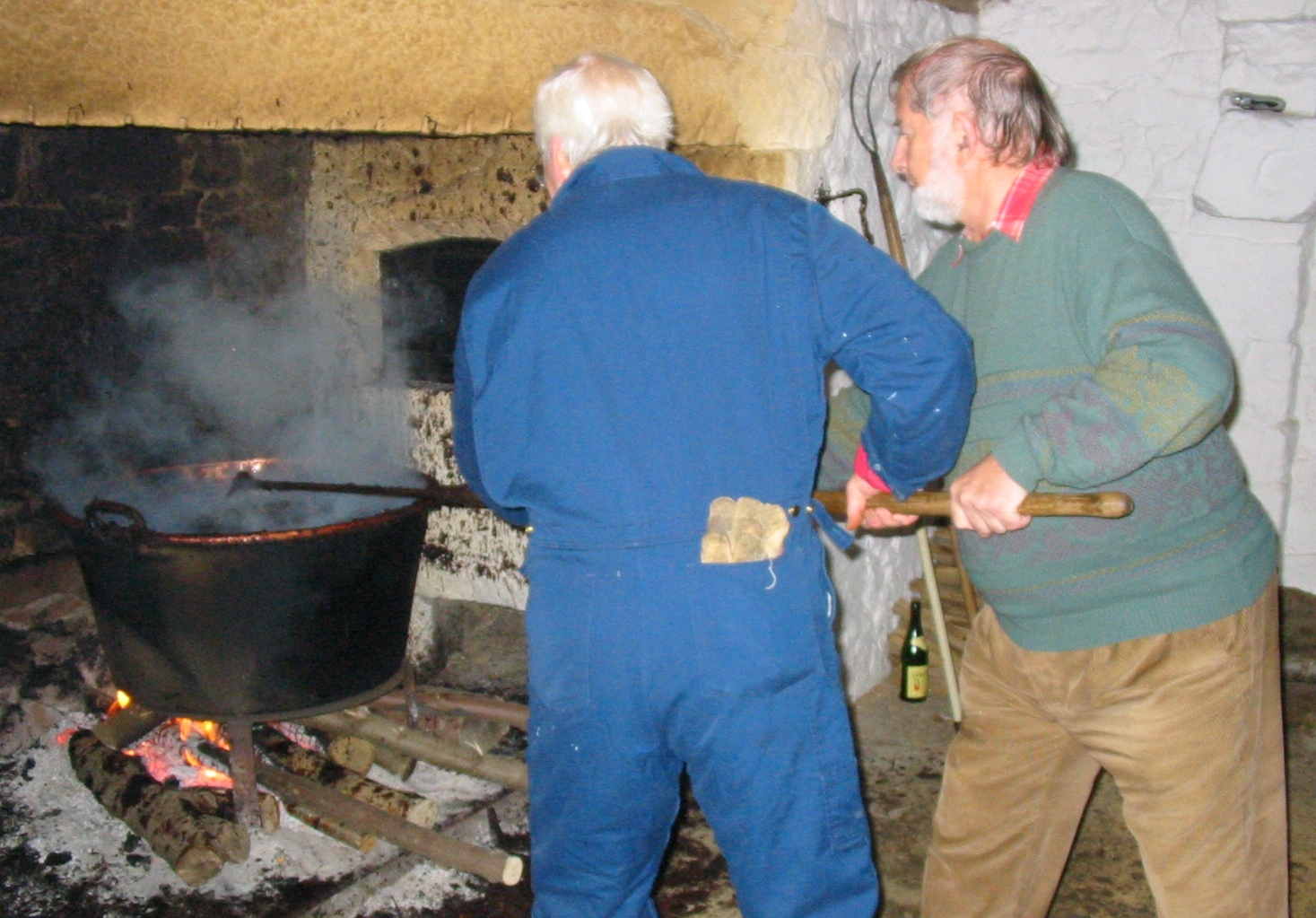
Making black butter on the island of Jersey

== Events ==
In various locations across the United States, the production of apple butter is associated with a community event, most often occurring in the fall at the end of the apple-harvest season. At many of these events, apple butter is cooked on-site in the traditional method, using huge copper kettles over open fires that are stirred for hours.

Apple Butter Makin' Days has been held on the courthouse square in Mount Vernon, Missouri, each October since 1967. Kimmswick, Missouri, and Berkeley Springs, West Virginia, each have an annual apple butter festival, as well. Grand Rapids, Ohio, also celebrates with an Apple Butter Fest on October 12. There is also an Apple Butter Stir Off held on the first weekend in October in Belpre, Ohio.

Wellesley, Ontario, has an annual Apple Butter and Cheese Festival on the last Saturday in September.

Fenner Nature Center in Lansing, Michigan, also has an annual Apple Butter Festival on the third weekend of October.

Oak Glen, California, has an Apple Butter Festival in November on Thanksgiving Weekend as part of the close of their official Apple Harvest Season.

== See also ==
- List of spreads
- Fruit butter
