= Cuisine and specialties of Nord-Pas-de-Calais =

Cuisine and specialties of the Nord-Pas-de-Calais region, France

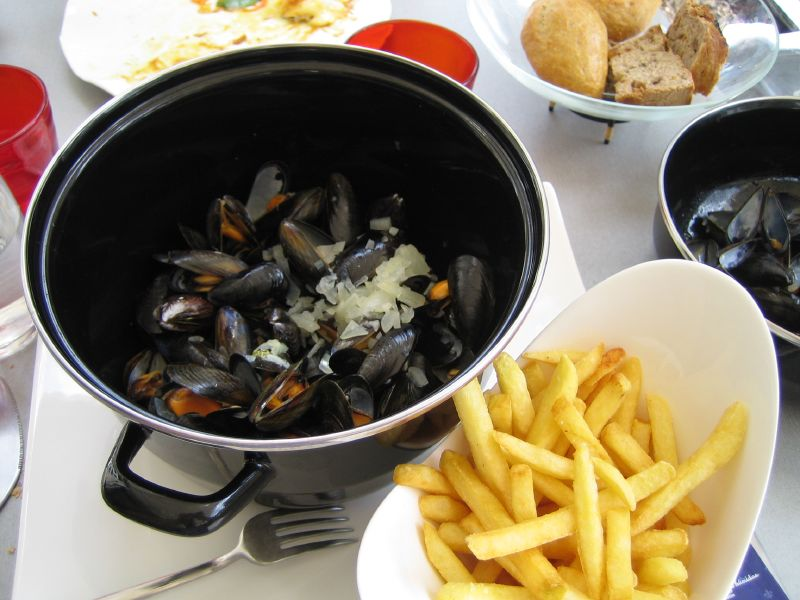
Mussels are a speciality of the Boulonnais and Calais regions; the moules-frites is the culinary symbol of the Lille braderie.

The Nord-Pas-de-Calais cuisine is a French regional cuisine, whose specialties are largely inherited from the county of Flanders. The region has always been at an intersection of Europe, and traces of its history can be found in its specialties, such as the English influence on the Côte d'Opale, or dishes of Polish origin in the mining basin.

Nord-Pas-de-Calais is a major agricultural and dairy farming region, and a producer of cheeses, including the most famous, Maroilles, which is used in a variety of flamiche. Its coastline is home to France's largest fishing port, Boulogne.

Between land and sea, its primary products are herring, rabbit, potatoes and beer. Historically, this is a cuisine based on butter or lard, with little use of oil. It is characterized, among other things, by bitter-sweet flavors, such as those of braised chicory, beer cooking, or coffee chicory.

In 2023, Hauts-de-France was awarded the "European Region of Gastronomy" label.

== History ==
=== A major agricultural region ===
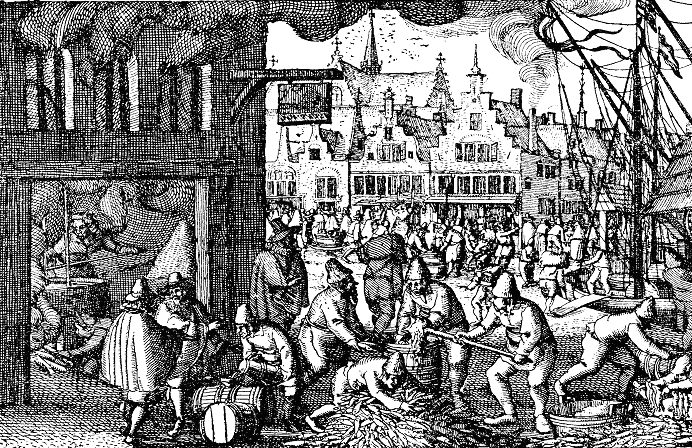
A method for preserving herring in barrels dating from the 14th century in the Netherlands is attributed to Willem Beukelszoon.

The region was already known for its agriculture when it was part of Gallia Belgica. Pliny cites the great variety of vegetables grown: onions, cabbages, and broad beans, as well as different varieties of apple trees. Vast expanses of einkorn wheat and barley were used to make bread, as well as cervoise. Sea salt works along the coast produced this product used to preserve meat and fish: Menapii ham, salted or smoked, was renowned and imported as far away as Rome.

In the Middle Ages, the region was Christianized, and the abbeys became the owners of much of the land and organized its exploitation. Tithes were paid in goods - for example, in Maroilles cheese, created around 960 A.C. by the abbey of the same name, (Note: It was created at the initiative of the bishop of Cambrai, Enguerrand, who suggested that craquegnon be aged longer. See Pierre Brunet, Histoire et géographie des fromages, Université de Caen, 1987, p. 79.) whose "edict of the pastures" imposed affinage on every cow owner. (Note: This edict was confirmed in 1245 by the bishop of Cambrai, then by the Court of Mons in 1356, in the following terms: "Tout li manant et habitant ens dittes villes qui avoient vache donnant laye devoient et estoient tenus annuellement de tout ce lait que toutes lesdites biestes donnoient en cestienne nuit Saint jean Baptiste, faire fromage et ychiaux porter ou envoyer lendemain à l'église de cescune ville Saint Humbert, u as lieux accoutumés et délivrer as comis u députés en che cas dudit labbet, et on otel manière à cestienne nuit el jour Saint Remy.")

As early as the 11th century, the construction of dykes protected the coastline and created the first polders; in the 12th century, their drainage through the waterings system enabled new land to be reclaimed from the sea for livestock breeding, cultivation, and fish farming.

The Catholic Church required the practice of Lent on about 166 days a year; as a result, herring was abundantly consumed by the people, making Boulogne-sur-Mer an important fishing port. The regular size of the fish meant that it was used as a unit of payment for seigniorial rents or royalties, or for tithe payment.

The grapevine, acclimatized by the Romans, remained cultivated until the Little Ice Age, but its production was very uneven; it also provided verjuice to accompany dishes. Beer remained the popular drink, while the courts of Flanders and Artois imported wine from Burgundy and Arbois, and abbeys owned vineyards in other regions.

In the Middle Ages, Artois was the region's granary, and bread remained an important part of the diet. After the Black Death of the 14th century, during the crisis of the late Middle Ages, the population was reduced by a third, and agriculture began a slow transformation. New crops were introduced (peas, turnips, etc.), with some regional specialization and diversification into bocage and grazing activities.

=== Multiple influences ===
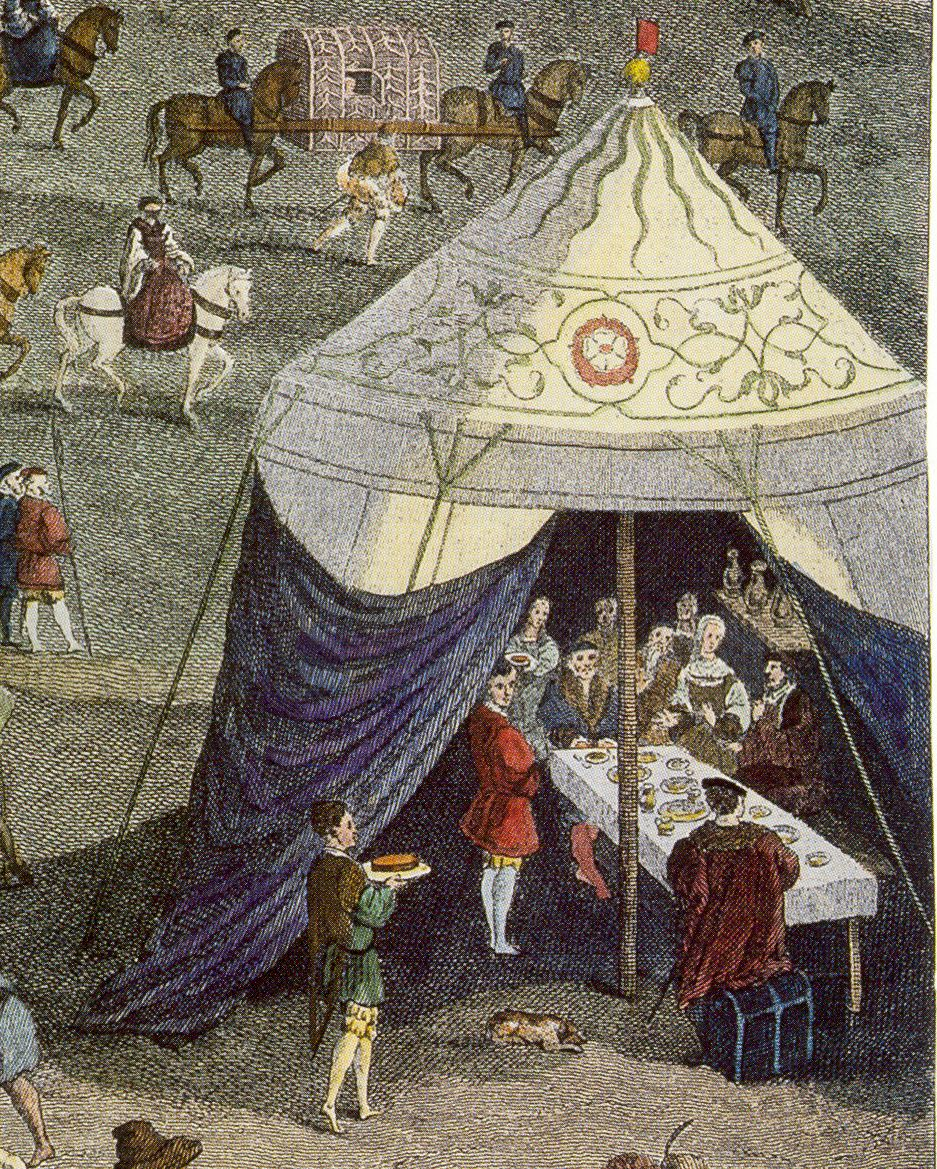
Field of the Cloth of Gold, reception at Balinghem, where the courts of Francis I of France and Henri VIII competed in 1520

From the 9th to the 17th century, the region was part of the Kingdom of France, the Burgundian, and then the Spanish Netherlands, with some towns passing from one to the other on several occasions or, like Calais, being English possessions. Cuisine, like regional culture, has therefore been influenced by many factors.

The Counts of Artois and the Dukes of Burgundy held memorable feasts such as the 1454 Feast of the Pheasant in Lille, or those at Château d'Hesdin, featuring roast poultry in multicolored jellies, fountains of fruit juices, and live entertainment. Their cooks left no cookery books, but Vivendier was used, inspired by Viandier de Taillevent, which already contained the recipe for potjevleesch.

In the major cloth-producing towns, the bourgeoisie also held banquets of this kind, such as those held annually on the Fête de l'Épinette in Lille.

Some recipes by Hotin, cook to the "seigneur de Roubaix", appear in a version of Le Ménagier de Paris. Both sweet and savory tarts feature prominently; in the 16th century, flamiches were cheese tarts made with bread dough, while goyère was a sweet white cheese tart.

According to La Bruyère Champier, during the 16th century, "in Artois and Hainault, ordinary food was dairy and butter, because the country has abundant pastures; and pork, because it is easy to fatten this animal; as well as pastries, which excel in diversification and are the main table honors".

After the discovery of the New World, new vegetables were slowly introduced and, at first, tomatoes were only cultivated as an ornamental plant; turkeys, on the other hand, were appreciated from the outset, with the Premonstratensians of Licques Abbey raising them as early as the 17th century.

=== Industrial revolution ===
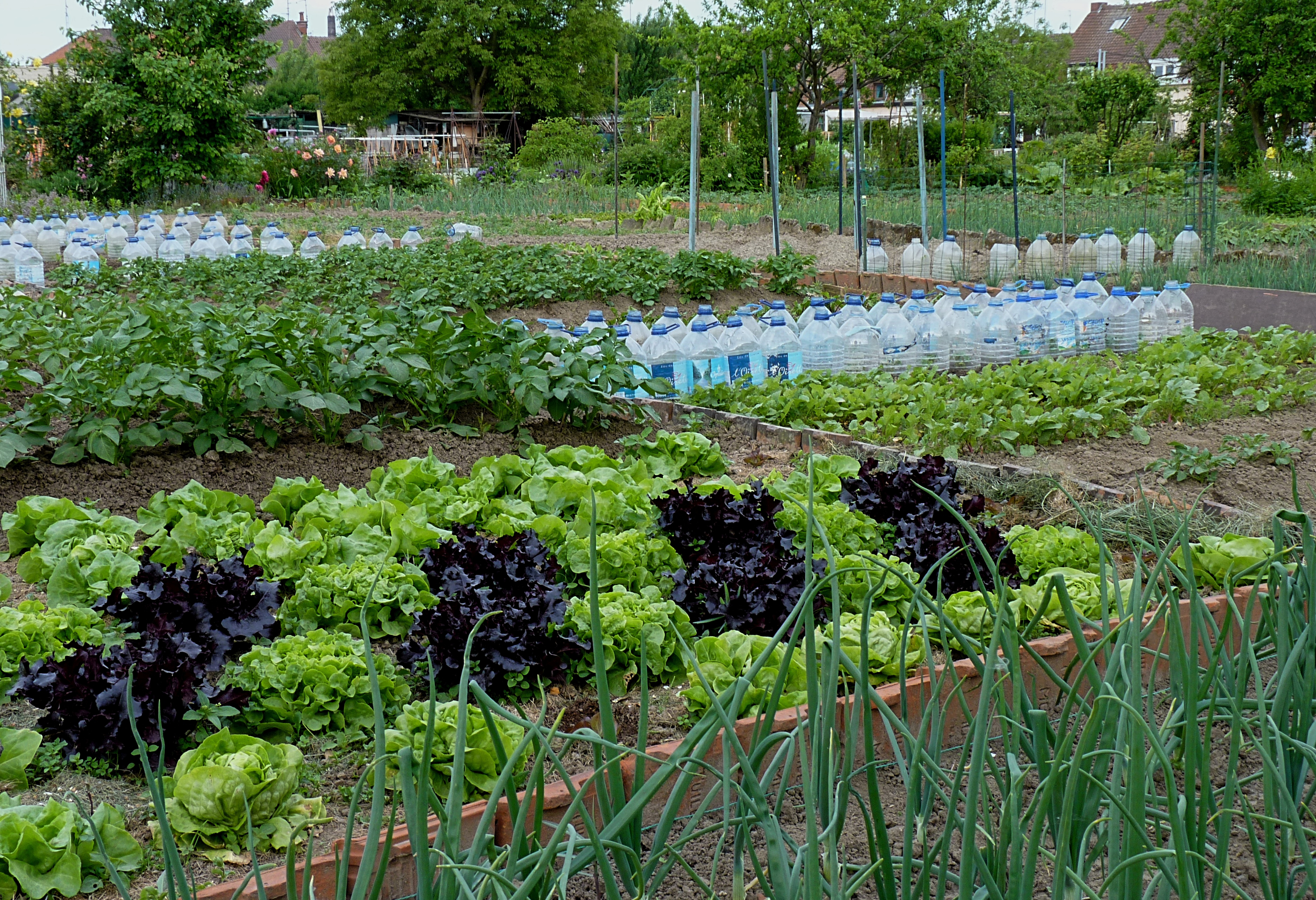
Allotment gardens in Tourcoing

Coffee was introduced in the 17th century and became a popular product with the Industrial Revolution, as a hot drink to keep you awake during a long working day. In Germinal, Zola describes it as a basic necessity, second only to bread.

In the early 19th century, continental blockage led to the development of sugar beet cultivation to compensate for the lack of cane sugar. It was also at this time that chicory began to be roasted, in the absence of coffee. Around 1850, the city of Lille began to grow barbe de capucin, the ancestor of chicory.

Beer production in the abbeys gradually declined in the region, with Trappists settling instead just over the border in Chimay, Westvleteren, and Orval. It gave way to numerous artisanal breweries, reaching about a thousand in the early 19th century, and almost two thousand in the first half of the 20th. The number of estaminets also increased, as they were the ideal places for workers to relax. To distract them, allotment gardens were created at the instigation of Lemire abbey; the corons also had gardens, where miners grew vegetables and raised poultry or rabbits for feast days.

Despite rapid industrialization, agriculture remained dynamic. Potato cultivation developed to cope with the population boom; the popular diet consisted of soups, vegetable stews, and dairy products since meat was too expensive. By the end of the 19th century, working-class children were chronically undernourished, especially those in the textile industry. Hygienists encouraged the consumption of horsemeat, which was presented as healthy and inexpensive. Meat, particularly in the form of charcuterie, only became more common on the working-class table at the end of the 1920s, between the rationing of the two world wars.

For wealthier circles, the standard of gastronomy at the time remained Parisian cuisine: when tourism began to develop on the Opal Coast, regional cuisines were not popular, hence special trains were used to transport cooks and other hotel staff to holiday resorts such as Le Touquet.

=== Today's traditions ===
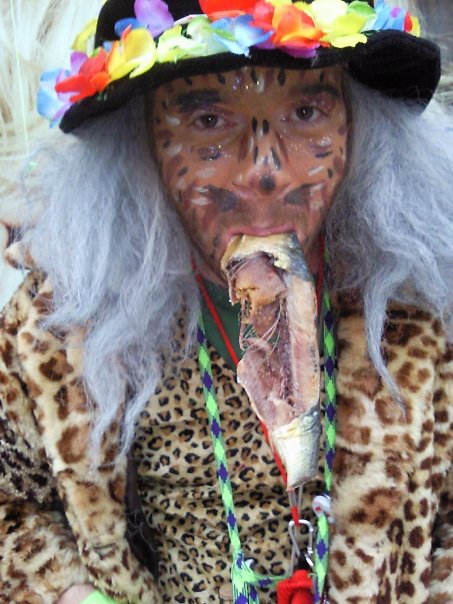
Herring at the Dunkirk carnival

Just as in the rest of France, eating habits in Nord-Pas-de-Calais changed from the late 1960s onwards. Cradle of modern French mass retailing, the region also saw the emergence of fast-food chains such as Flunch in 1971, and Paul bakeries, which aimed for a higher standard of quality. Most meals, however, were eaten at home, with the family.

In family cooking, oil was still used very little, but margarine, which has long been held in low esteem, replaced lard as a substitute for butter. The habit of eating soup in the evening fell into disuse; the region produces many vegetables, but Northerners eat very little of them: less than two fruits or vegetables a day among two-thirds of young adults.

French fries are widely consumed, and the baraque à frites remains a regional specialty. In the 2000s, there were around 300 in the region, compared with almost 8,000 previously. In the 21st century, despite some communes prohibiting them, the business was integrated into buildings in certain neighborhoods. In Lens, France's first drive-through friterie opened in 2012.

The region remains one of the world's leading beer consumers, but young people are turning away from this beverage, which was mainly enjoyed by adults, and turning to sodas and, occasionally, premixes. Daily consumption remains high, however, particularly among men over 55.

Culinary traditions persist to a greater extent during the festive season: pastries for the end-of-year festivities, or croustillons for ducasses. They have also renewed: the tradition of mussels and French fries at the Lille braderie dates from the 1970s, as does that of herring throwing at the Dunkirk carnival in 1962. One of the most recent is the International Soup Festival in Wazemmes, a reminder of the region's multiculturalism.

== Local products ==
=== Agricultural products ===
Nord-Pas-de-Calais remains a major agricultural region, characterized by highly intensive farming and large-scale crops (cereals, beet, potatoes, etc.) that take up a large part of the landscape.

==== Potato ====
The region supplies one third of France's potato production:

- the main variety is the Bintje, produced in the Lys valley under the PGI appellation pomme de terre de Merville;
- Ratte du Touquet is a specialty of the Opal Coast.

==== Vegetables ====
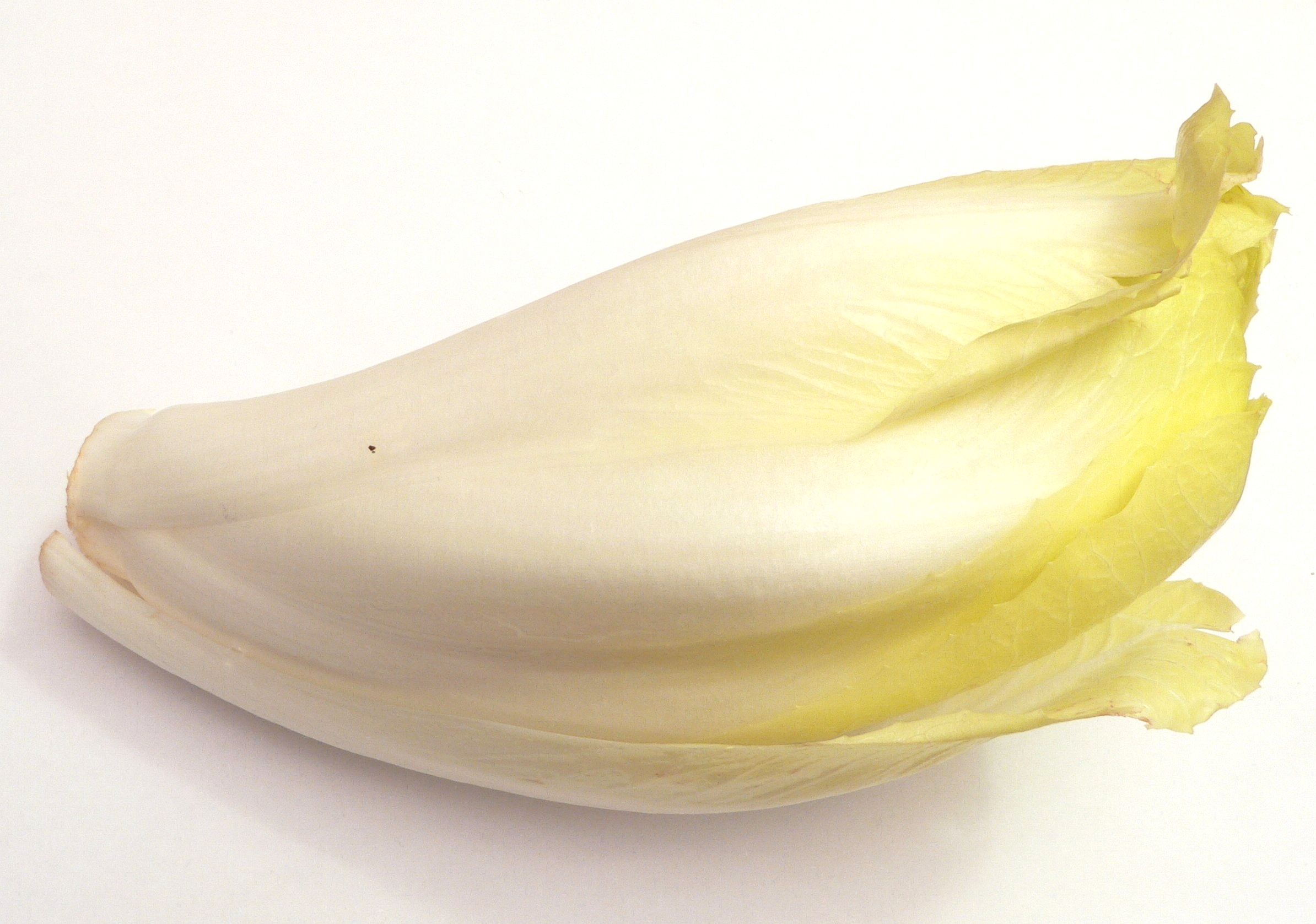
Endive, also known as chicory

The region ranks third in France for vegetable production:

- chicory, or endive, plays an important role: Nord-Pas-de-Calais is the leading producer, supplying 50% of world production.
- Market gardening in the marais audomarois biosphere produces cauliflowers, artichokes and leeks. The region also produces fruit such as apples and strawberries, like the Samer strawberries.
- Smoked garlic from Arleux has been a PGI since 2013.
- Other vegetables grown in the region are largely destined for canning factories, including those of the regional company Bonduelle.

=== Fish ===
In 2012, the port of Boulogne-sur-Mer was still France's leading fishing port, handling just over 36,000 tonnes of fish. Herring, which has made Boulogne-sur-Mer such a success, comes in a wide range of specialties, originally used to preserve herring: salted and smoked (kippers and buckling), pickled (rollmops) or canned (pilchards).

=== Meat ===
Meat is also preserved in various charcuterie specialties, including horsemeat, consumed in large quantities in the Nord-Pas-de-Calais region, where the flagship product is horse sausage.

==== Poultry ====
Chicken from Licques has been a Label Rouge since 1979.

==== Charcuterie ====
Specialities of French locals include:

- in Lille, petit salé,
- in Valenciennes, Lucullus de Valenciennes,
- in Cambrai, andouille de Cambrai (pork casings in a beef bladder) and andouillette de Cambrai (caul of a calf), also known as (French: crépine) in pork chowder, authorized since 2015 after a long ban), or menu de boeuf. Arras has preserved butchery traditions close to those of Cambrai, and has also suffered from the ban (mad cow crisis) on certain offal from veal.

Made famous by the film Bienvenue chez les Ch'tis, frikandel is a meatball shaped like a sausage, characteristic of friteries.

=== Cheese ===
The Nord-Pas-de-Calais region offers a wide range of cheeses, most of them made from cow's milk. The most famous are:

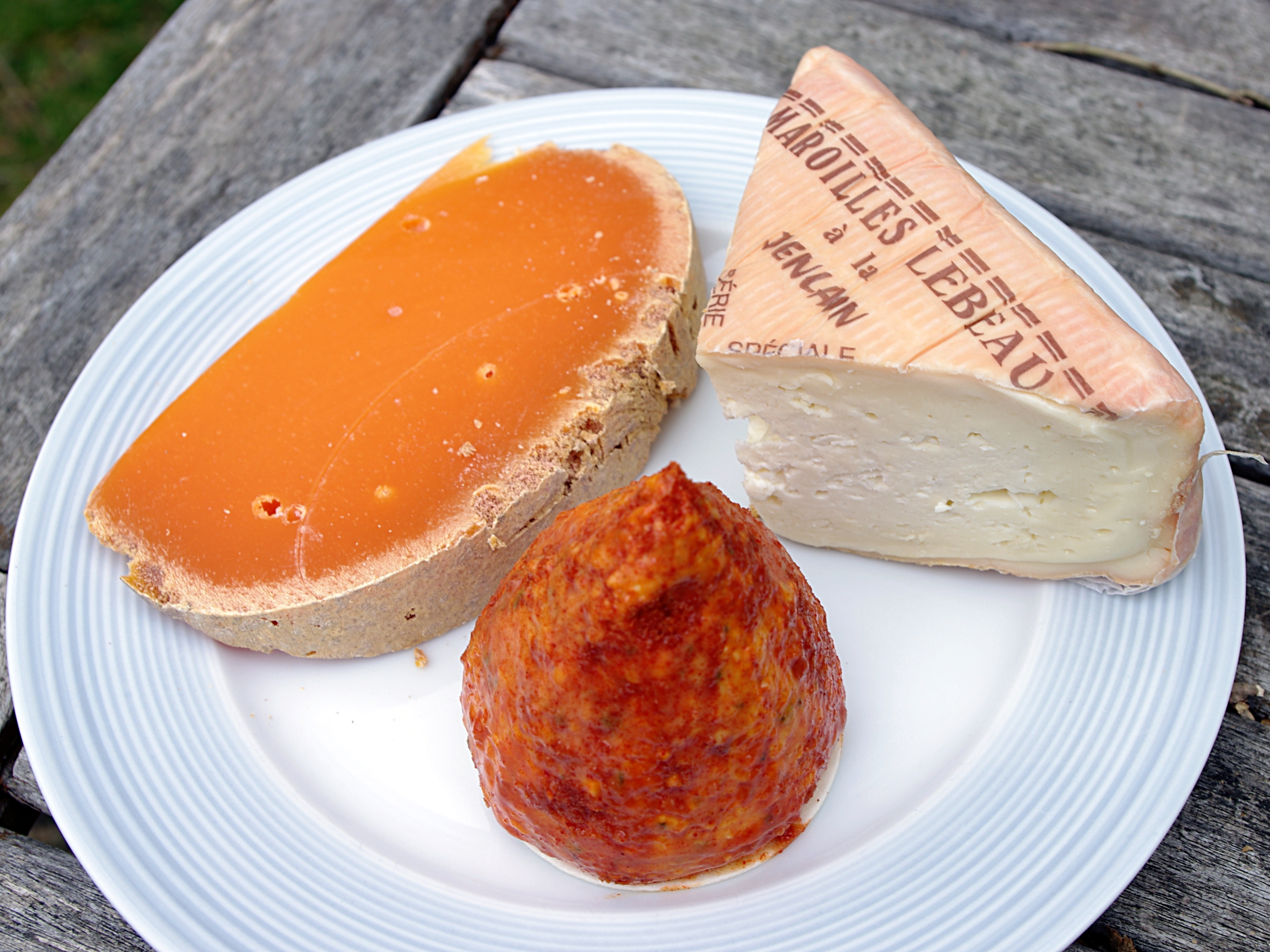
Mimolette, maroilles and boulette d'Avesnes

- belval,
- bergues (raw milk cheese),
- boulet de Cassel,
- Boulette d'Avesnes,
- brique des Flandres,
- carré du Vinage de Roncq,
- cœur d'Avesnes,
- dauphin,

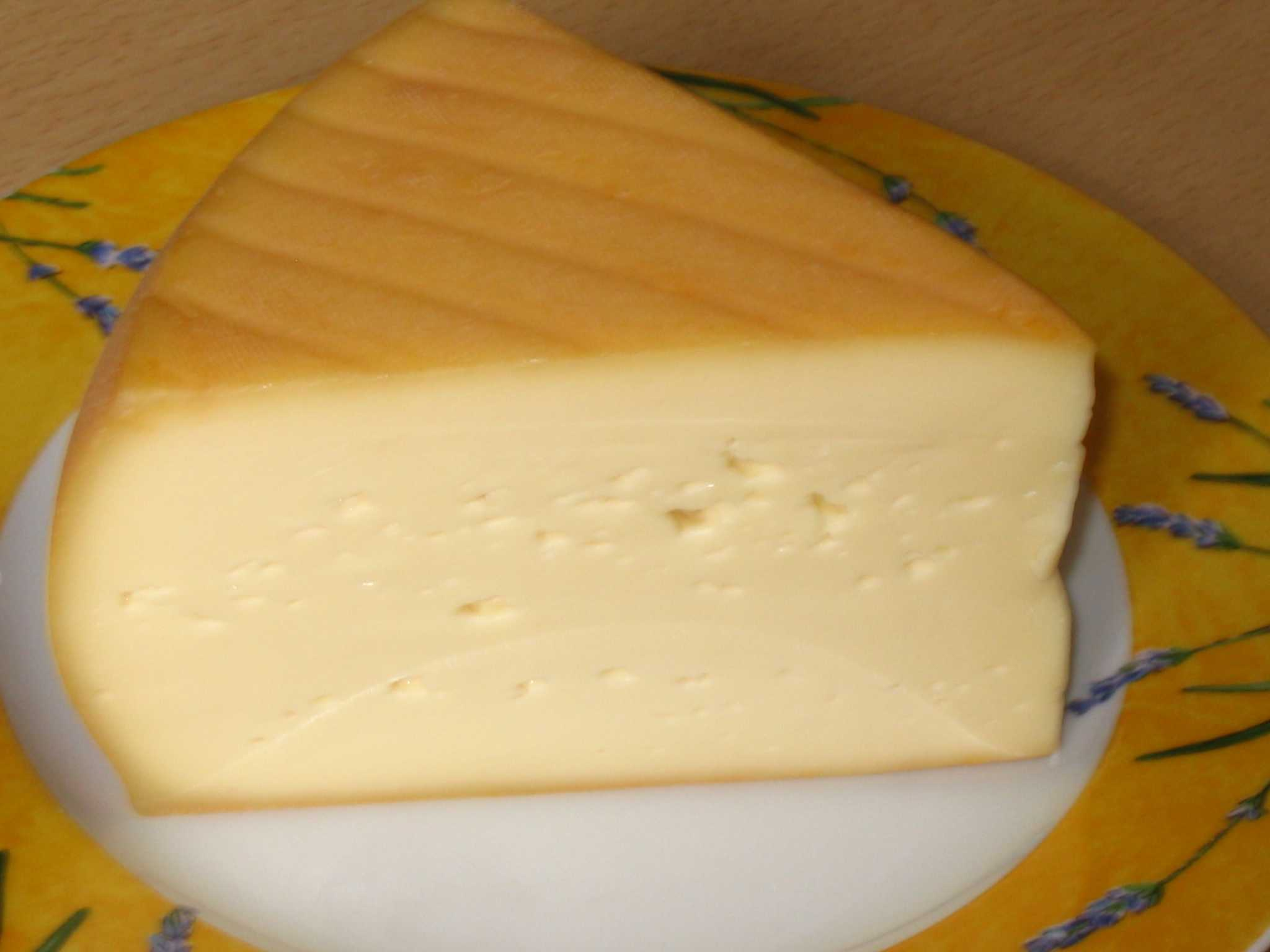
Mont des Cats cheese

- l'écume de Wimereux,
- fleur d'Audresselles,
- fort d'Ambleteuse,
- fort de Béthune,
- Maroilles cheese (AOC and PDO),
- Mimolette (uncooked pressed cheese),
- Mont des Cats cheese (uncooked pressed cheese),
- Pavé bleu,
- Pavé de Merris,
- Pavé de Roubaix,
- Wissant shortbread,
- Tome de Cambrai,
- vieux-boulogne, said to be one of the world's most aromatic cheeses (made from raw milk),
- vieux-lille.

=== Confectionery ===
The sugar used in the Nord-Pas-de-Calais region comes from beets; production began in the early 19th century, following the continental blockage, and expanded rapidly, enabling chocolate factories to diversify.

- Bêtise de Cambrai, a mint-flavored candy-striped with caramelized sugar, was created around 1850. The Afchain and Despinoy confectioners disputed authorship for a long time.
- The Francorusse confectionery, better known as La Pie qui Chante, created the first filled sweets.
- Delespaul-Havez, founded in 1848 and renowned for its chocolate, created Carambar in the 1950s.

Even today, the Nord-Pas-de-Calais region is not left behind when it comes to confectionery: one in every four French sweets comes from this region. This is thanks largely to Lutti, the second biggest brand in France, which has its main production site in Bondues.

In addition to the specialities already mentioned, some are less well known outside the region, such as :

- babeluttes from Lille,
- chocolates from Beussent,
- chiques de Bavay,
- chuques du Nord,
- pastilles du mineur,
- les boulets du Ch'ti, la gayantine,
- le terril de Germinal,
- Bouquet d'Or's bamsemums,
- P'tit Quinquin sweets and
- sottises de Valenciennes.

== Cuisine ==
=== Specialties ===
There are three meals a day in the Nord-Pas-de-Calais region; similar to Belgium and some French provinces, they are called "déjeuner" (breakfast), "dîner" (lunch), and "souper" (dinner).

Breakfast often consists of a cup of coffee, black or with milk, with a slice of bread. For example, faluche, a soft bread from Nord-Pas-de-Calais, is eaten at lunchtime, or as a snack, with butter or brown sugar. Mont des Cats, a mild cheese, can also be eaten first thing in the morning, while Maroilles is less common.

Nord-Pas-de-Calais cuisine is based on butter, with oil rarely used except for vinaigrette. Lard, which was used for cooking, is also sometimes eaten simply spread on bread, under the Flemish name of smout.

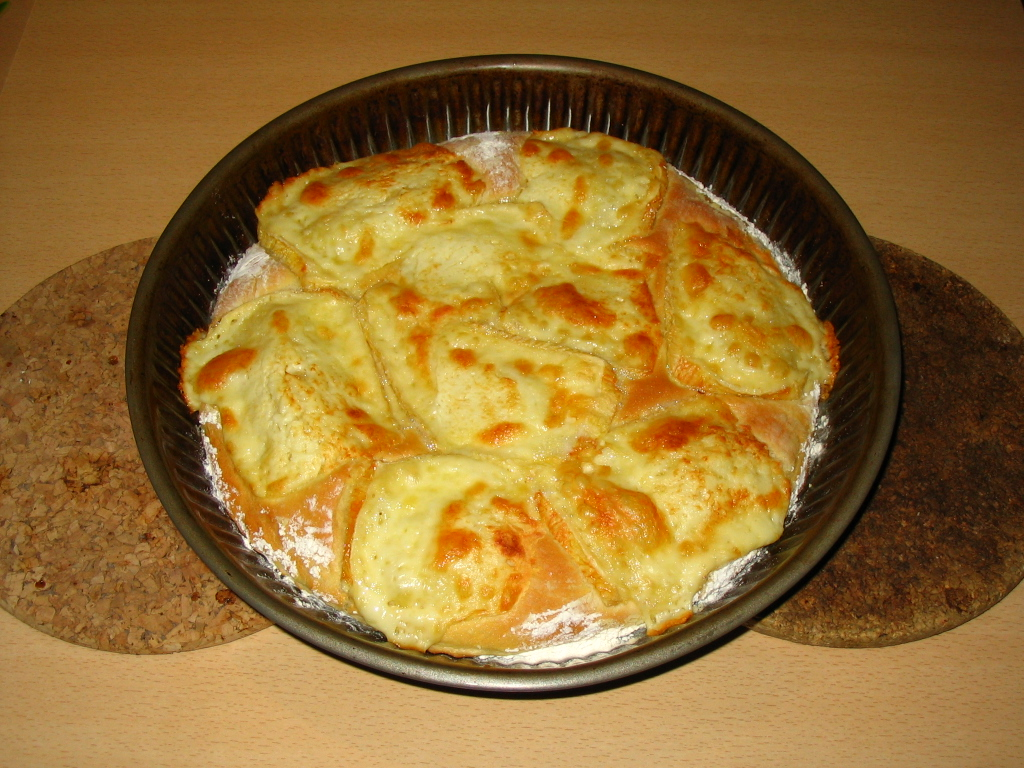
Tarte au maroilles

Maroilles cheese is also used in cooking. A dish often found in the region is a piece of beef (steak or entrecôte), accompanied by a Maroilles sauce. Other typical dishes include tarte au maroilles and goyère de Valenciennes.

Potatoes are often served alongside dishes; French fries are prepared in the Belgian style, cooked twice in beef fat or oil.

Regional cuisine includes many Flemish dishes, such as waterzooï, hochepot or potjevleesch, a typical Dunkirk dish made with a mixture of meats in jelly. Endive (called "chicon" in the region) is also one of the region's emblematic vegetables, representing 90% of national production, and is used in the recipe for chicon au jambon.

Sweet and savory flavors are appreciated here: prunes or baked apples can accompany white meats; reinette apples are used with light brown sugar in Flemish-style red cabbage, while flemish stew is cooked with brown sugar and pain d'épices.

=== Cuisine à la bière ===
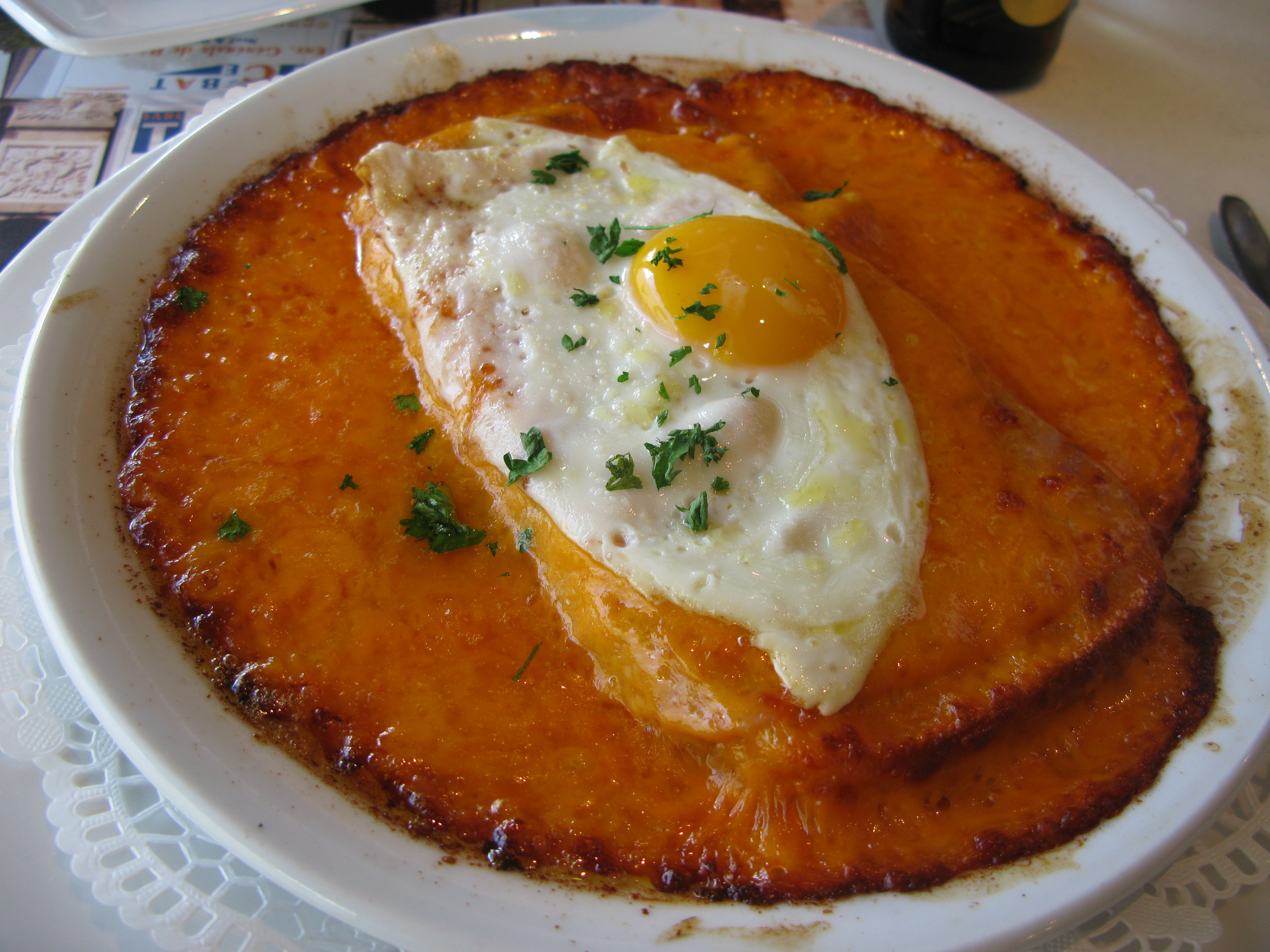
Welsh rarebit

The Flemish influence can be seen in beer-flavored dishes such as coq à la bière, where the bitterness of the beer is often softened by a sweet taste, like the pain d'épices in Flemish stew, or the fruit in lapin à la tournaisienne (rabbit with prunes). These dishes, especially those featuring rabbit, are typical of festive occasions.

Other influences are also present: in Boulogne-sur-Mer or Calais, welsh rarebit, originating in Wales, has become a regional specialty.

Beer is also used as yeast in beignets and couquebaques, Flanders' crêpes à la bière, as well as in the dough used to make flamiches.

=== Marine cuisine ===
Besides herring, which we've already mentioned, seafood is a major component of Côte d'Opale coastal cuisine.

Mussels are a speciality of the Boulonnais and Calais regions, prepared in marinara or with a dash of vinegar, and often accompanied by French fries as in Belgium. Mussels can be found in fish recipes "à la boulonnaise", in caudière (a fish soup made by the fishermen of Étaples), and in cream of cauliflower with mussels (a speciality of Audomar).

Seafood and white fish cassolette.

Fish is generally served with steamed potatoes. Chicon is also popular, served raw in a salad with buckling, or braised in a casserole with fish and scallops.

The origins of Dunkirk's specialties are Flemish. Grey shrimps are prepared as croquettes, but more often served plain, with a buttered toast. Finally, waterzooï is a fish and vegetable dish with a cream sauce, which can also be prepared with chicken.

=== Desserts and pastries ===
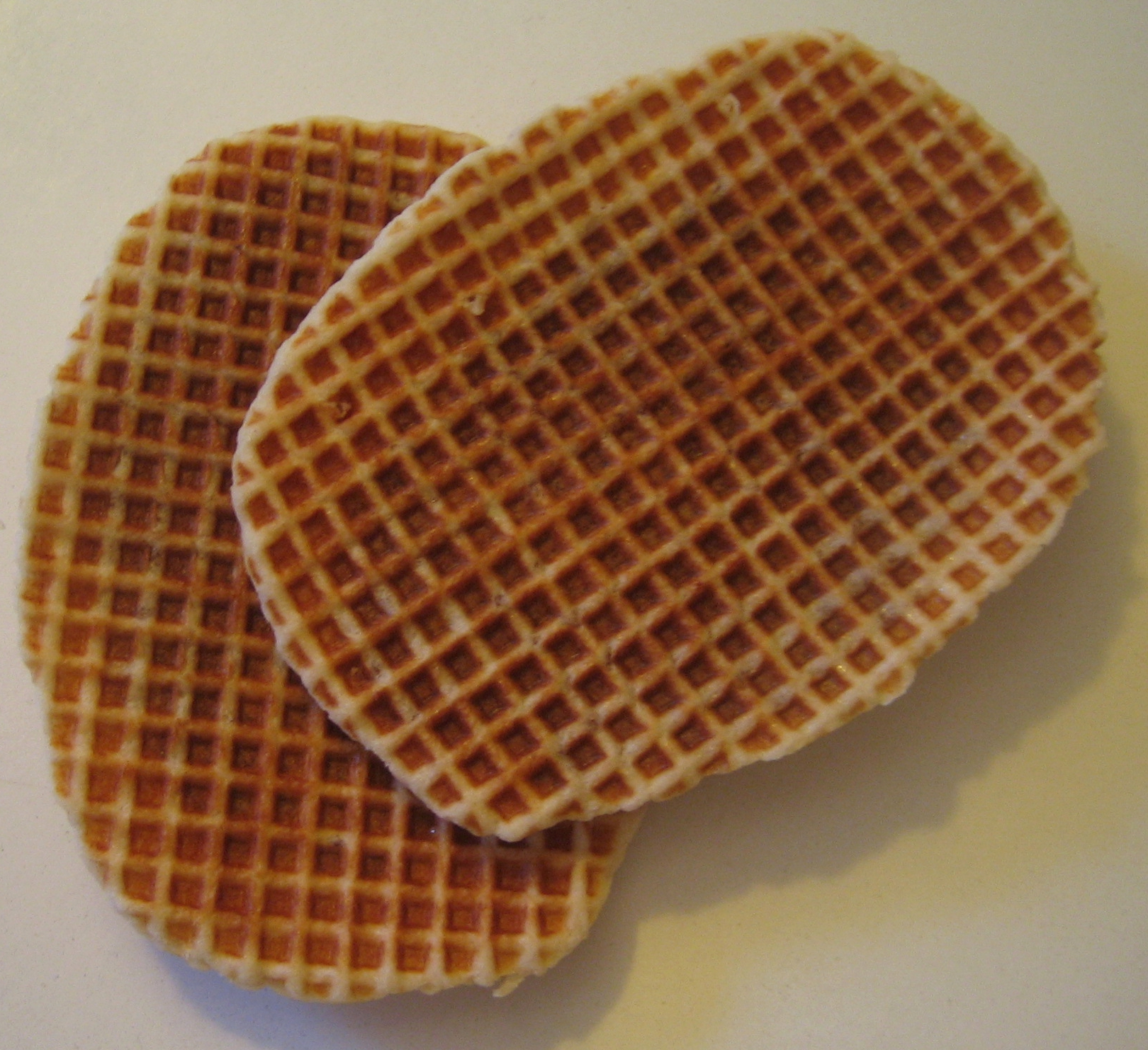
Gaufres fourrées lilloises (stuffed waffles from Lille)

One of the most popular family desserts in the North of France is the tart, traditionally made with yeast dough. It can be a simple apple, prune or rhubarb tart, but local specialties include:

- tarte au papin (also known as tarte au libouli or tarte à gros bords), filled with flan, and sugar pie, filled with a vergeoise preparation;
- cœur d'Arras, a heart-shaped cake similar to gingerbread, is a specialty dating back to the 11th century. Today, a chocolate variant is also available.
- vergeoise (known locally as "brown sugar") is a soft, fragrant, baked sugar. It is particularly used in desserts, for example, sprinkled on crêpes à la bière frequently cooked in the region;
- couques suisses (balls of dough cooked in boiling water and filled with butter, originally from Valenciennes),
- waffles, such as Brussels waffles and Liège waffles;
- waffles filled with vergeoise from Lille. These have been the trademark of Maison Meert since 1848;
- Speculaas, a spiced cookie originally in the shape of St. Nicholas, and made on Christmas. They now come in a variety of shapes and are eaten all year round;
- in the Boulonnais region, christmas pudding, originally from England, is the most popular Christmas dish;
- the coquille de Noël, or quéniole, is a brioche in the shape of a baby Jesus, eaten during the Saint-Nicolas period at Christmas; in Belgium, it's known as cougnou. It is often given to children in schools before the Christmas vacations, and to the elderly in packages distributed by town halls at this time of year;
- makocz, a poppy brioche, is also a Christmas pastry, a tradition brought over by Polish miners;
- fine waffles, such as dunkerquoises waffles, are typical on New Years; they were traditionally offered to family members who came to wish their elders a happy new year.

=== Drinks ===
==== Coffee and chicory ====
Northerners are avid consumers of coffee, enjoyed as a strong beverage, often containing chicory; coffee that is too light is known by the pejorative term "chirloute". It is consumed sweetened "à la sucette", i.e. by taking a lump of sugar in the mouth and drinking the coffee over it.

There are around 25 coffee roasters in the region, and the local taste is of a medium roast, "monk's robe" color.

Consumption of chicory coffee developed in the early 19th century, following the continental blockade; Nord-Pas-de-Calais supplies 95% of French production, and the Leroux chicory company is the world's leading producer. Chicory is usually added to ground coffee for breakfast, but can also be consumed without the addition of coffee.

==== Beer ====
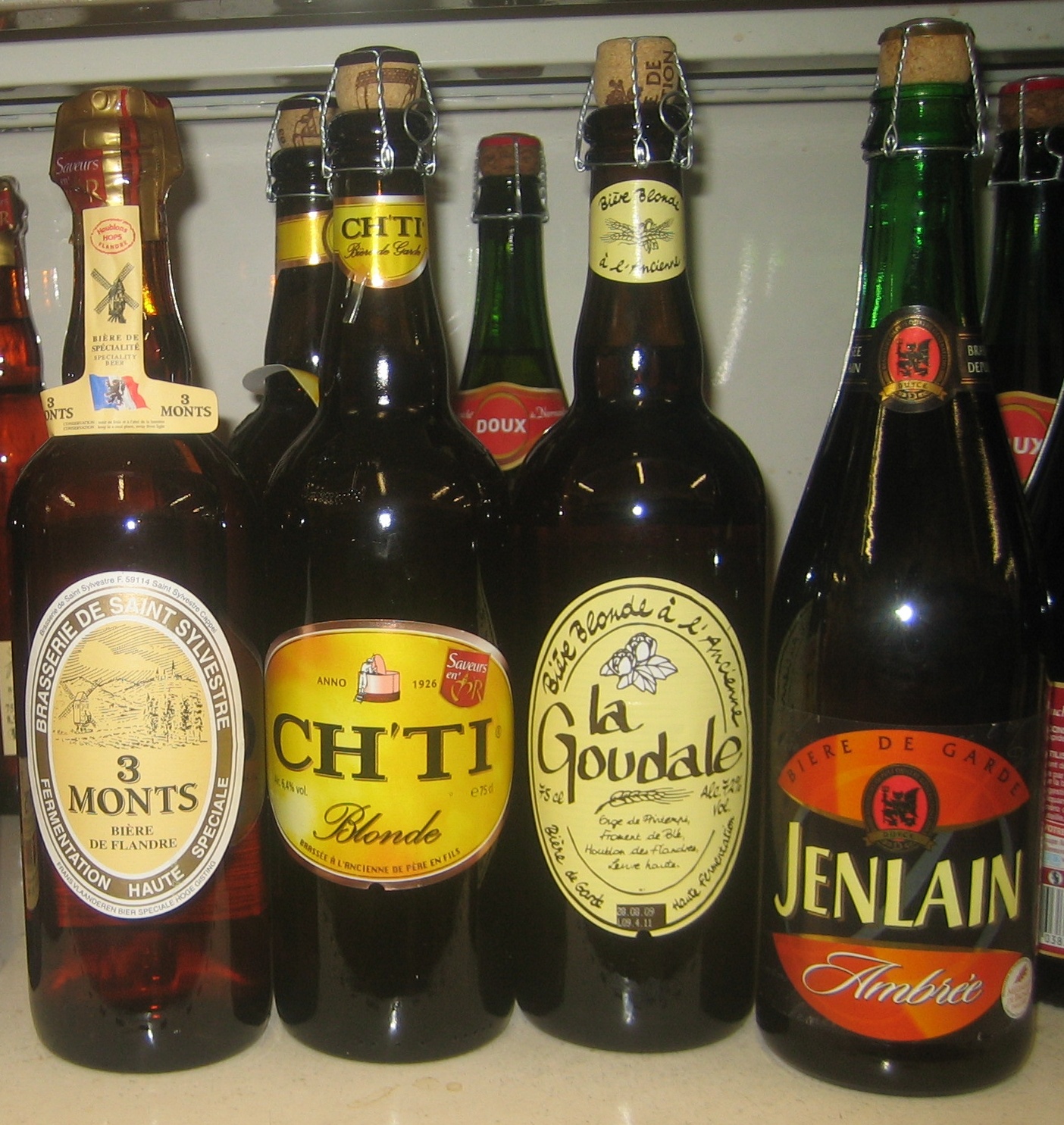
Beers: 3 Monts, Ch'ti, la Goudale et Jenlain.

Along with Alsace, Nord-Pas-de-Calais is one of two French regions where locally produced beer remains a traditional beverage. Northerners drink regional or Belgian beers, whose distinctive feature is that they generally have a fairly high alcohol content (around 7-10% vol.).

The region still hosts around twenty breweries, whose best-known beers are the "bière de garde": Jenlain, 3 Monts, Goudale and Ch'ti. Other beers with more local distribution are also well known: these include Grain d'Orge, Abbaye de Lille, Angelus, Munsterbräu, Page 24, Hommelpap, La Choulette, Moulins d'Ascq, Bavaisienne and Bracine, as well as extra-strong beers such as Bière du Démon and Belzébuth. Beer is also used as an ingredient in numerous culinary recipes.

Picon, the bitter-sweet aperitif liqueur that accompanies beer, is not a regional product, but the Nord region is one of its main consumers, along with Alsace. It is often drunk mixed with beer (Picon-bière as an aperitif).

==== Liquor ====
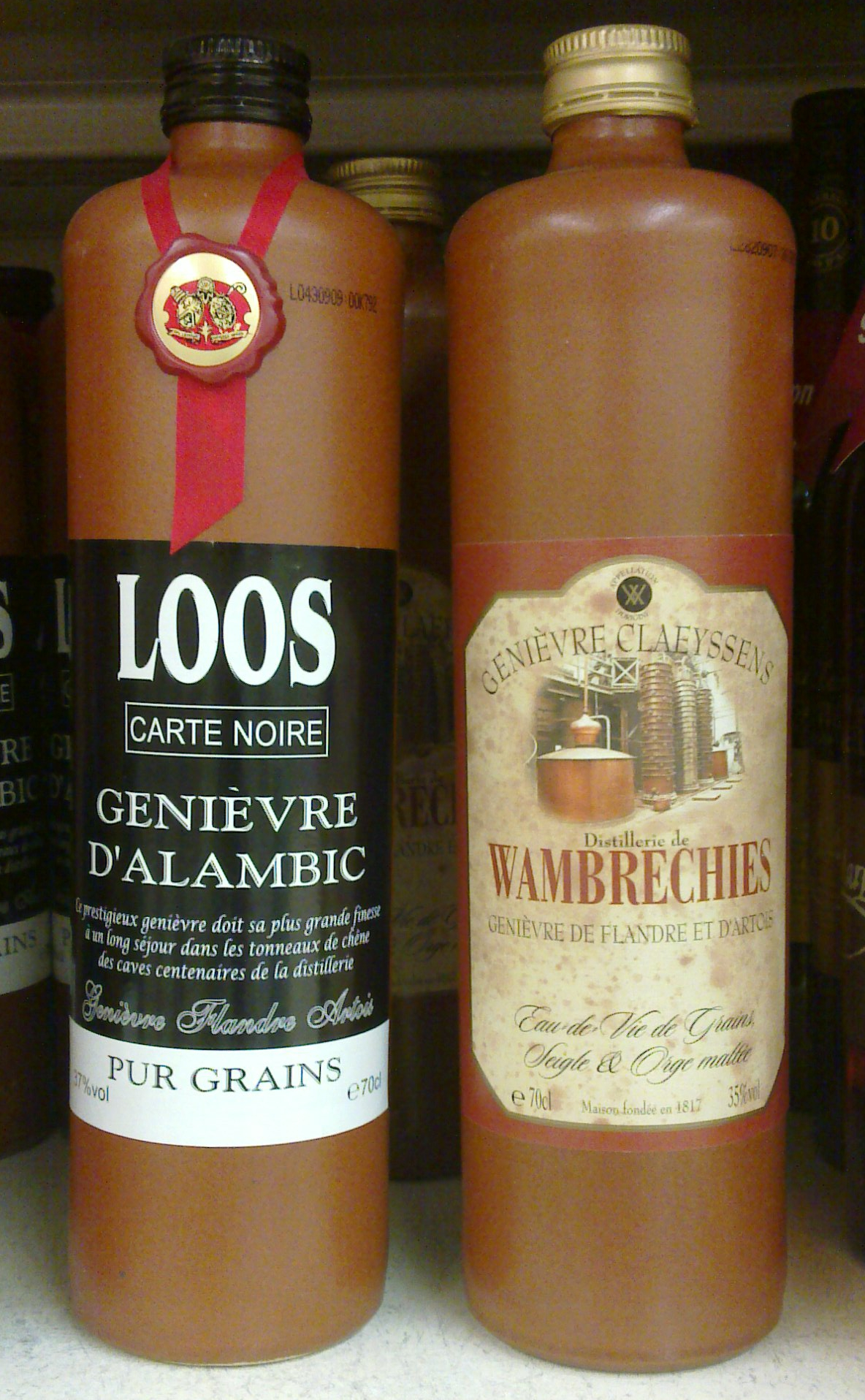
Jenever bottles from Loos and Wambrechies

Jenever, a strong liquor made from eau de vie and flavored with juniper berries, is also typical of the region: "sweet, strong and spicy", in the words of food critic Gilles Pudlowski. In the Nord-Pas-de-Calais region, the custom of pouring a little into coffee is known as "bistouille".

== Promotion ==
=== Recognition of regional products ===
Many local producers have obtained recognition for the quality of their products through Label Rouge, AOC or PDO certification.

Licques poultry, for example, has been a Label Rouge since 1979. Smoked garlic from Arleux has benefited from PGI since 2013.

Following the disappearance of the Nord-Pas-de-Calais regional label in 2002, a regional collective brand called Saveurs en'Or was created in September 2004, to promote products from the Nord-Pas-de-Calais region. It distinguishes products with both Label Rouge and Protected Geographical Indication (PGI) status.

=== A place in French and European cuisine ===
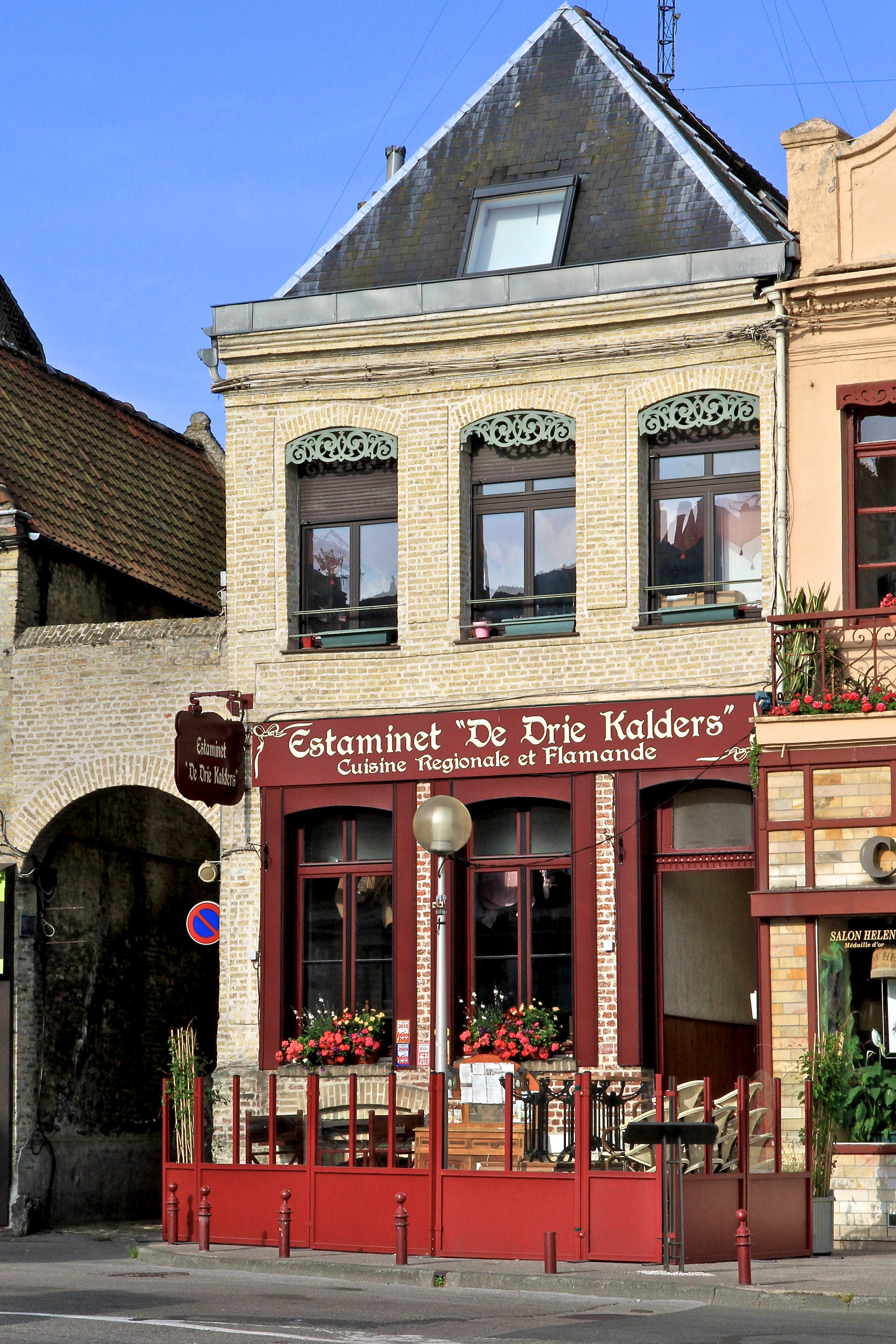
Estaminet in Saint-Omer

Nord-Pas-de-Calais cuisine is often overlooked in French gastronomy, even though certain products such as Houlle jenever and Cambrai bêtises have been listed among Trésors gourmands de la France.

Estaminets, which were very numerous before World War I, have experienced a revival since the 1990s. Once simple cafés, they remain convivial places where regional specialties are revisited.

Ghislaine Arabian, for example, earned two stars from the Michelin Guide for Restaurant à Lille, which features a menu devoted to cuisine à la bière, before moving to Paris to offer this regional cuisine.

In Busnes, Marc Meurin's cuisine based on regional products at his restaurant Le Meurin also earned him two macaroons in 2013.

In 2023, Hauts-de-France was awarded the "European Gastronomy Region" label by the International Institute of Culture, Gastronomy, Art, and Tourism.

== See also ==
- Audomarois
- Culture of Nord-Pas-de-Calais
- French gastronomy (cuisine)
- fr:Liste des mets belges
- Polish immigration to the Nord-Pas-de-Calais coalfield
