= Estaminet =

Type of bar from Belgium and Northern France

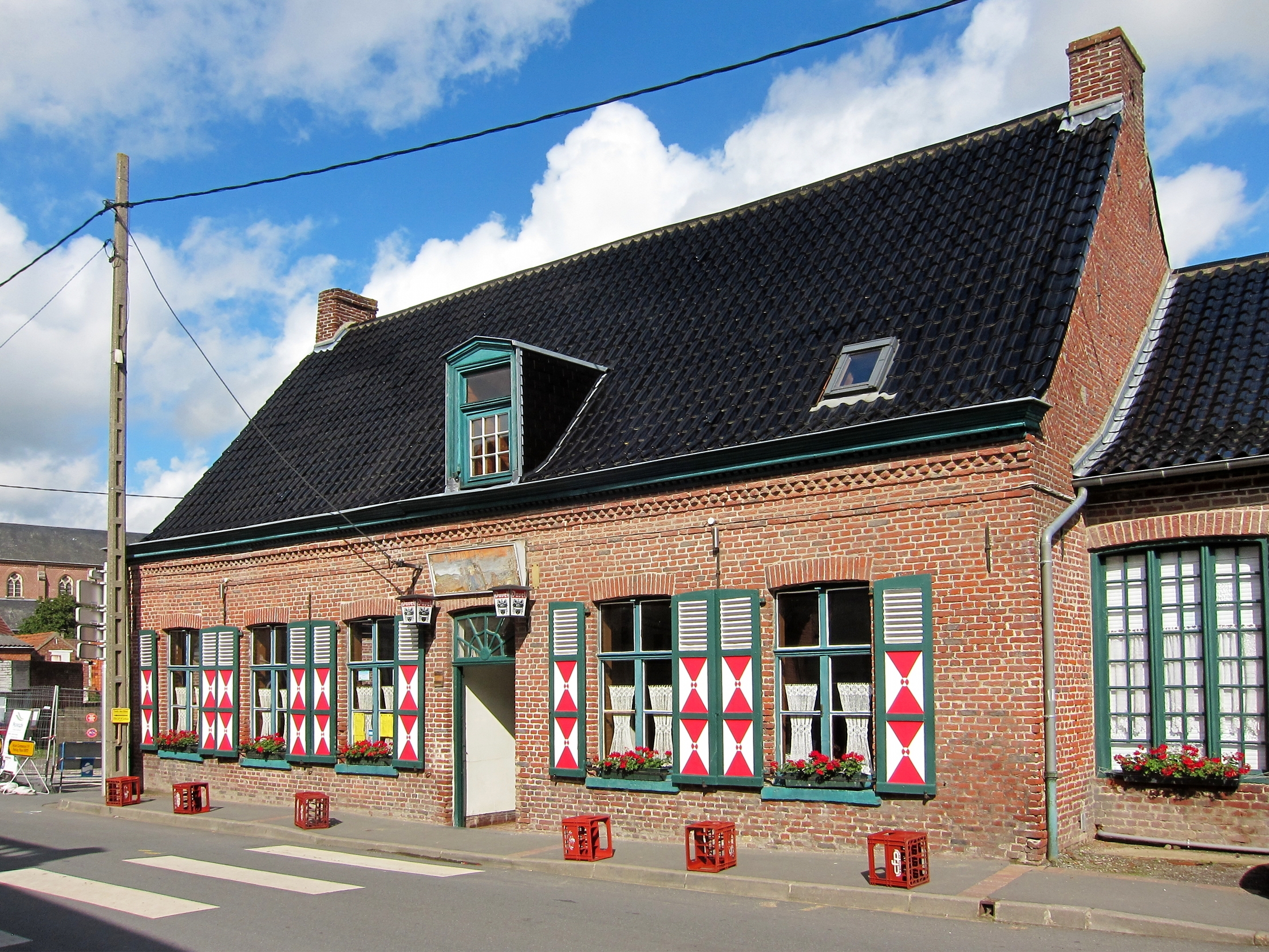
Flemish estaminet Le Blauwershof ("the den of fraudsters") in Godewaersvelde, Nord, France.

An estaminet is—in Picardy, French Flanders, Luxembourg, and Brussels—an establishment that serves various types of drinks, sells tobacco, and offers traditional games. The estaminets are part of the cultural heritage of these regions. In Brussels, a three-hundred-year-old estaminet is still open.

The word estaminets has also been in use in Paris in the 19th century, as Jules Lovy wrote about them on 18 April 1858 in Le Tintamarre.

In modern usage, estaminet refers to taverns, bistrots, inns, and brasseries typical of Nord Département in France that make use of ancient tools and typical rural, or traditional, decorations, and serve dishes and drinks from the region.

Estaminet from 1925 in Quéant, Pas-de-Calais, France.

== Etymology ==
In 1802, the Académie française defined the estaminet in a very short description: "Assemblée de buveurs et de fumeurs" (An assembly of drinkers and smokers).

The word has a Picard origin and comes from "estamet", which refers to the pillar supporting the roof of a room, and, by extension, the room itself.

== The estaminets in the 19th century ==
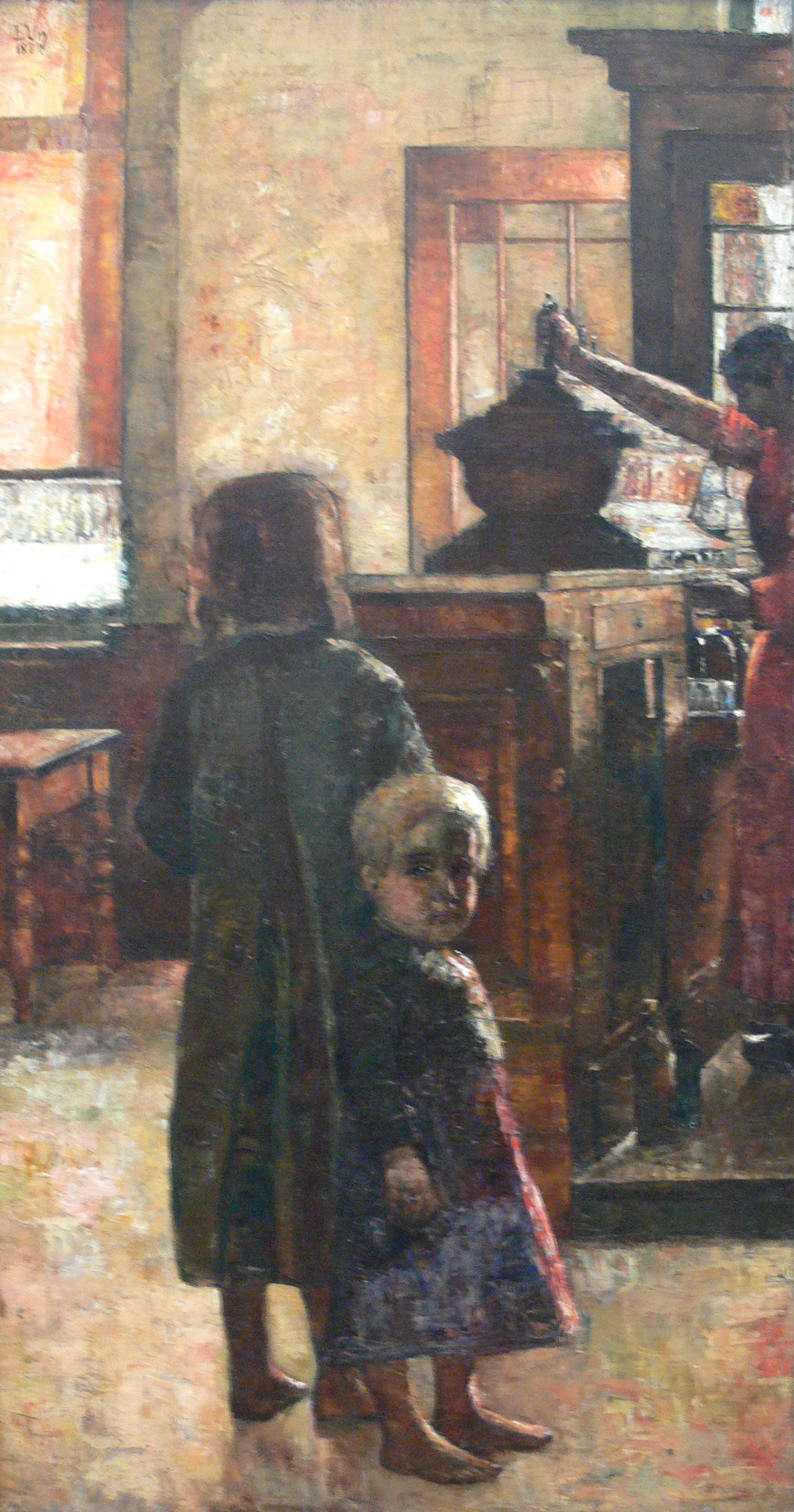
Flämische Schenke, (Estaminet, Flemish Tavern) by Lesser Ury 1884, Alte Nationalgalerie.

At the beginning of the 19th century, in the more elegant cafés, tobacco was forbidden, but smoking was permitted in the estaminets. The word "estaminet" was in common use before World War I and referred to an establishment where one could have a drink and smoke. There could be, at the same place, a grocery or a farrier facility, like today's multi-service cafés.

A place to socialize for workers, the estaminet was also the meeting point for local societies, like pigeon-keeping club members or feather-bowling players.

Some singing societies also included in their name the one of the estaminet where they are gathering. For instance, in Flers, there is a society called Les Amis-Réunis de l'estaminet du Pont du Breucq (the friends of Pont du Breucq estaminet). In Lambersart, there is a Société des Rigolos Réunie à l'Estaminet de la Carnoy à Lambersart (Society of amusing people gathered at la Carnoy estaminet in Lambersat). In Lille, there are several societies called Les Amis-Réunis à l'Estaminet du Grand Quinquin, Les Amis-Réunis à l'Estaminet du Réveil-Matin, Les Bons Buveurs de l'Estaminet de l'Alliance. In Roubaix, there are Les Amis-Réunis à l'Estaminet du Bas Rouge à Pile, Les Amis-Réunis Estaminet Bauwens, Les Amis Réunis à l'Estaminet du Poète de Roubaix, Les Amis-Réunis à l'Estaminet tenu par Augustin Roger. In Tourcoing, there is the Société des Amis Réunis, Estaminet du Lion-Blanc, à Tourcoing.

In Lille, on the eve of the First World War, the people were more likely to enjoy their hard lives in the estaminets, where they could relax, meet up with friends, sing patois refrains, and play a variety of games. These games included jeu du beigneau (throwing shuffles into a hole), jeu du bouchon (knocking down corks 9 meters apart), skittles, darts, and strength competitions.

== Estaminets during World War I ==
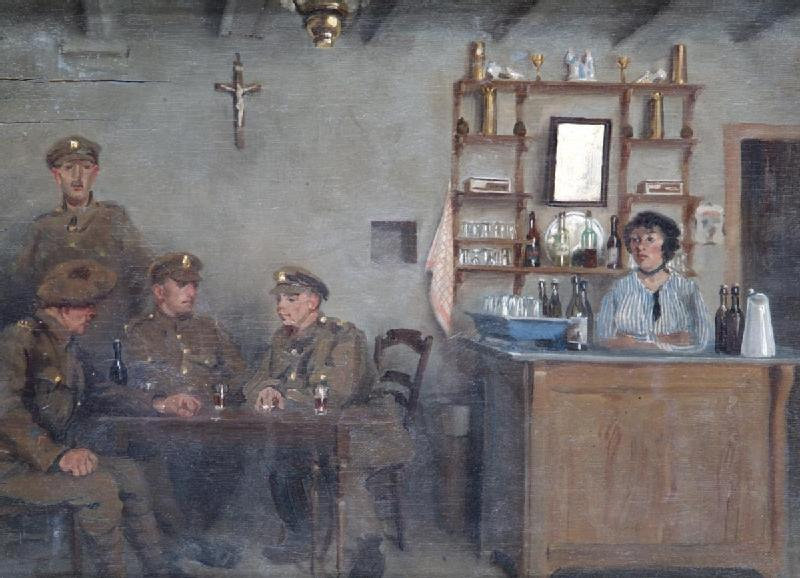
The Estaminet, by Haydn Reynolds Mackey: Depiction of British soldiers in an estaminet on the Western Front during World War I.

Egg and chips became popular in Britain during World War I due to a shortage of meat. It was a favourite food of Tommies behind the lines on the Western Front in northern France and Belgium, eaten at estaminets, which also sold cheap wine and beer.

== The estaminets revival ==
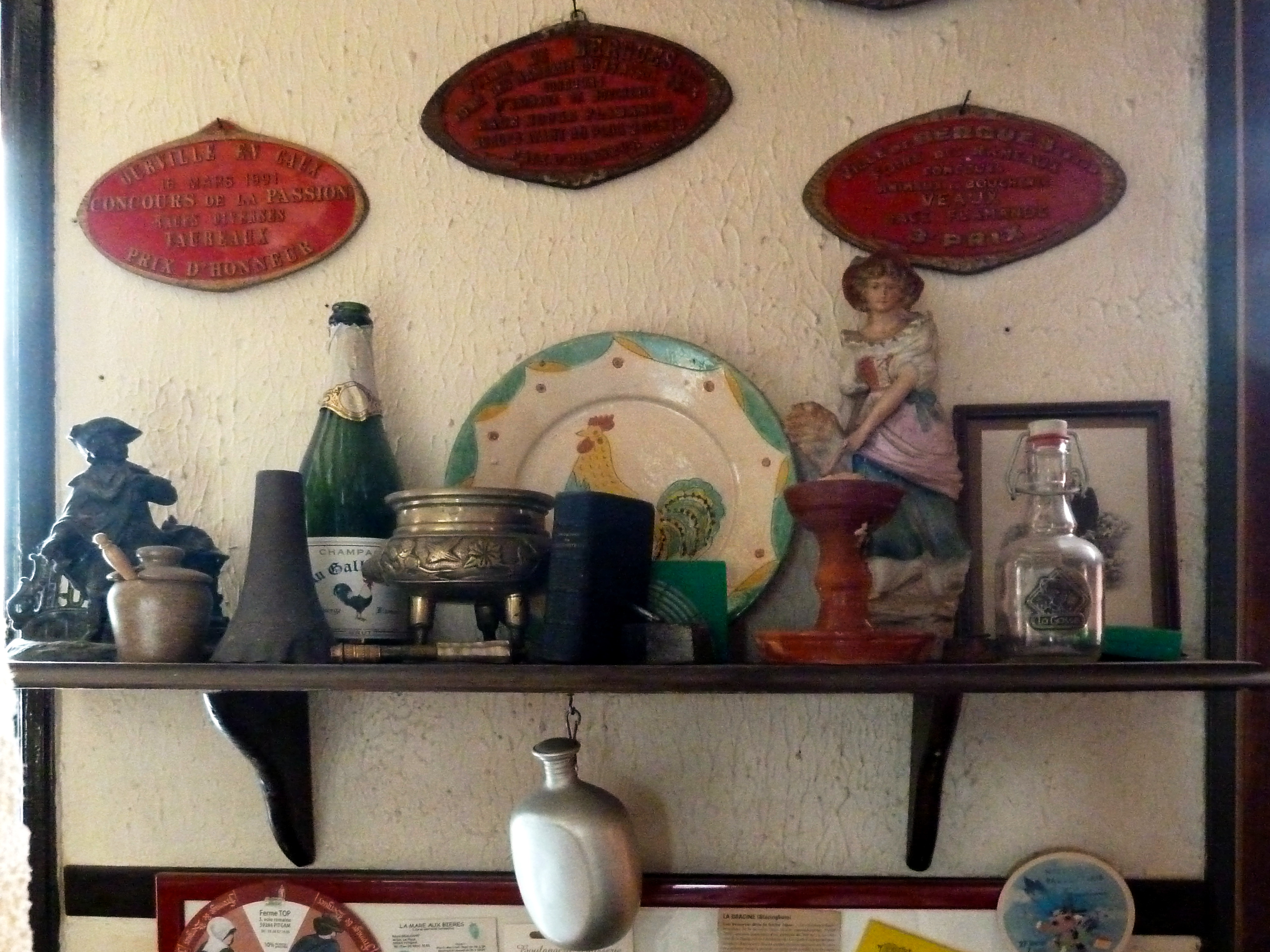
In the estaminet du gallodrome (the cockpit estaminet) in Drincham, Nord, France.

Nowadays, the name "estaminet" is given to different taverns, bistrots, or inns that make use of ancient tools as ornaments and typical, rustic, and traditional decorations. Hop is hanging from the ceiling, and old pictures are on the walls. Old bottles and "Vierpots" (ember pots) to light one's pipe are gathered on the fireplace. The menu shows dishes with Flemish names like "Waterzoï" or "Potjevleesch". Above the entry door, a placard is placed, with a depiction of the scrutiny of God, and is a warning to the customers against cursing (in Flemish: Hier vloekt men niet).

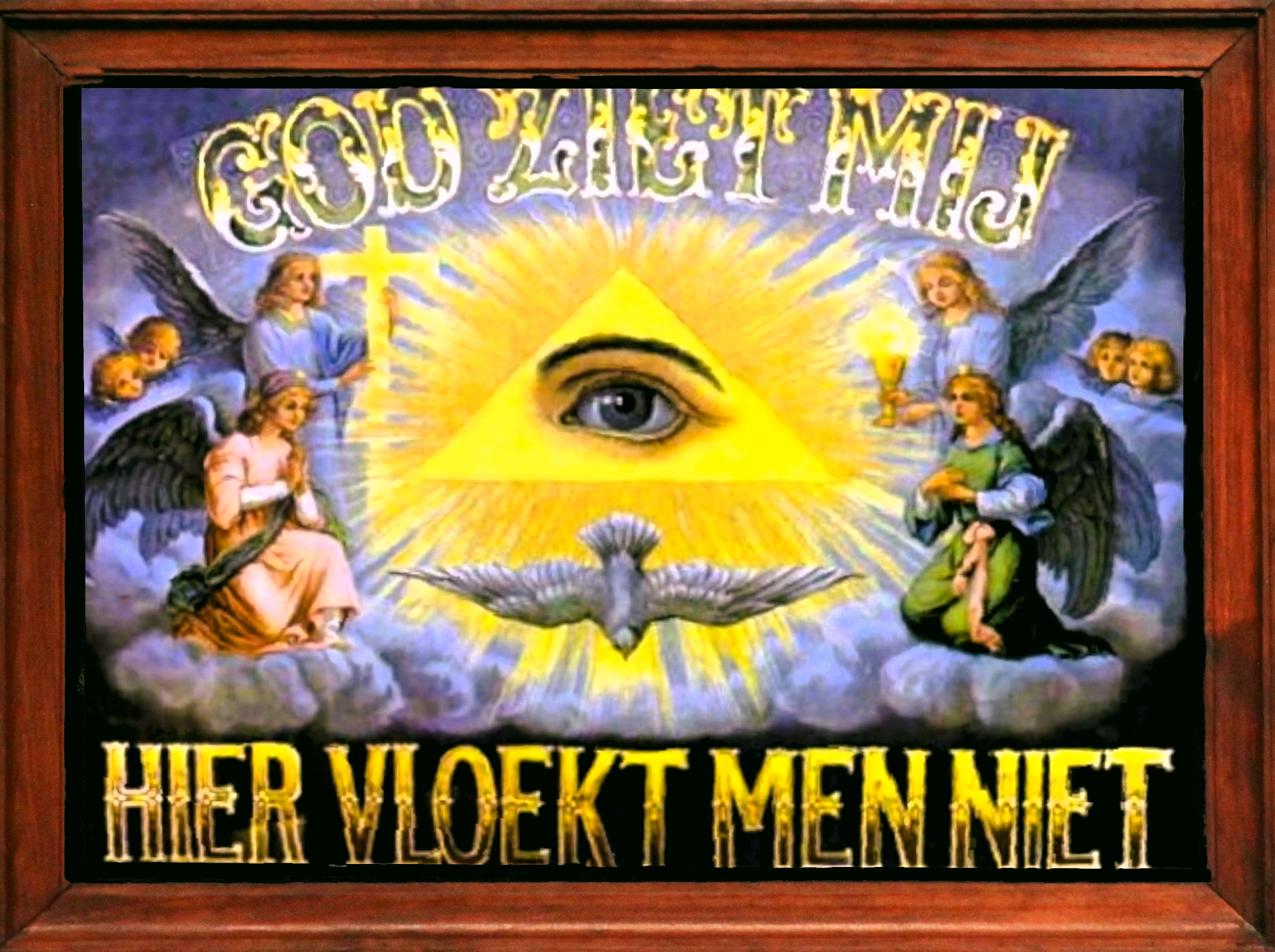
Hier vloekt men niet placard in Estaminet du gallodrome, Drincham.

== Estaminets in culture ==
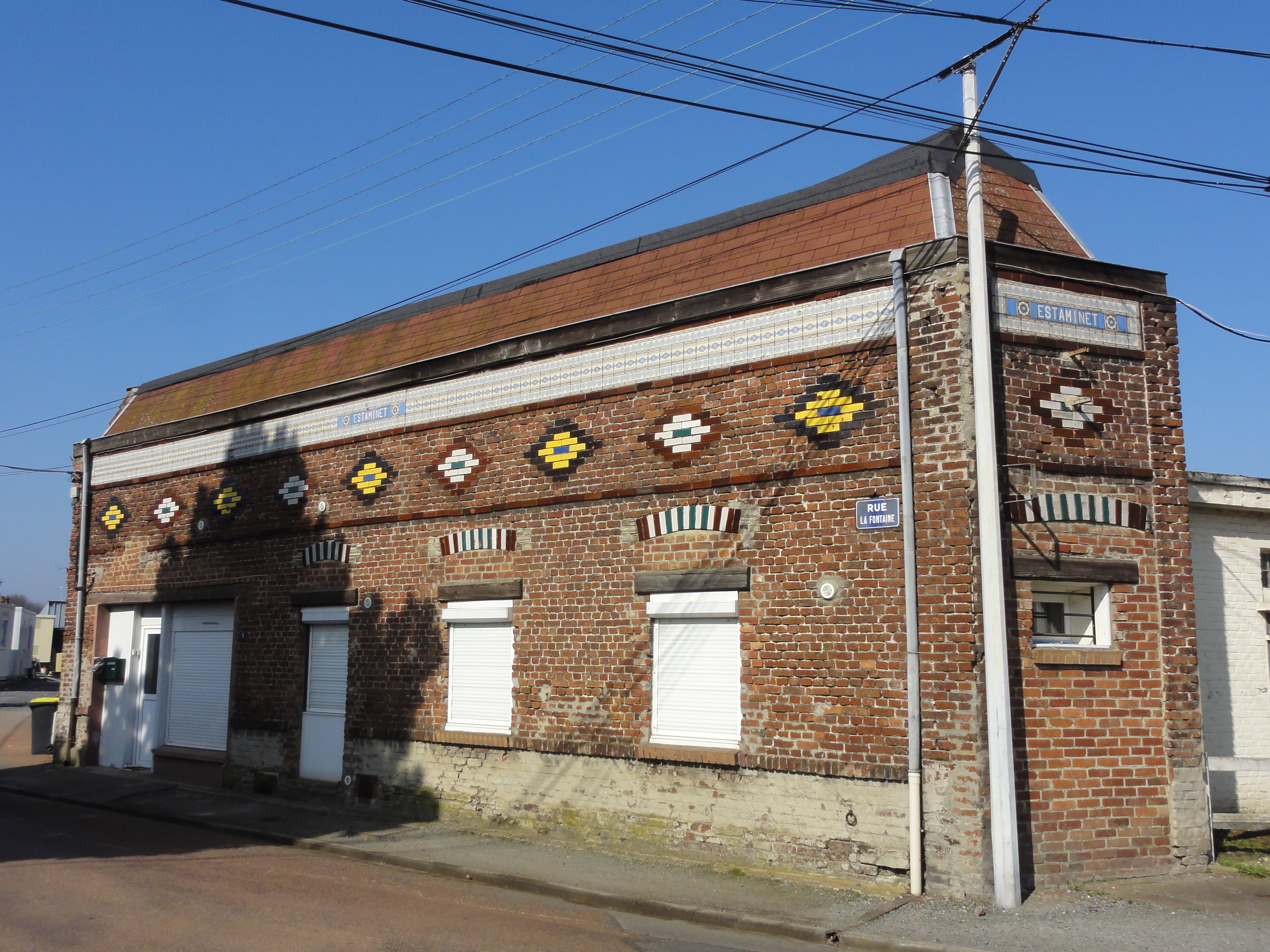
Estaminet Oude herberg (Old inn) in Dourges, Pas-de-Calais, France.

Victor Hugo used the word "estaminet," among other Walloon words, in his naturalistic novels set in the north of his country.

"Estaminet" is also the title of a short story by Gerard Walschap.

"The Estaminet" is a poem by Ivor Gurney published in Selected Poems about comradeship between soldiers during World War I.

Estaminet 'In 't Spinnekopke' is one of the recipients of the Bronze Zinneke, an award handed out by the cabinet of the Brussels Region to individuals, personalities, organisations, or companies that perform a role as informal ambassadors of the Brussels Region.

== Gallery ==
Estaminets in culture
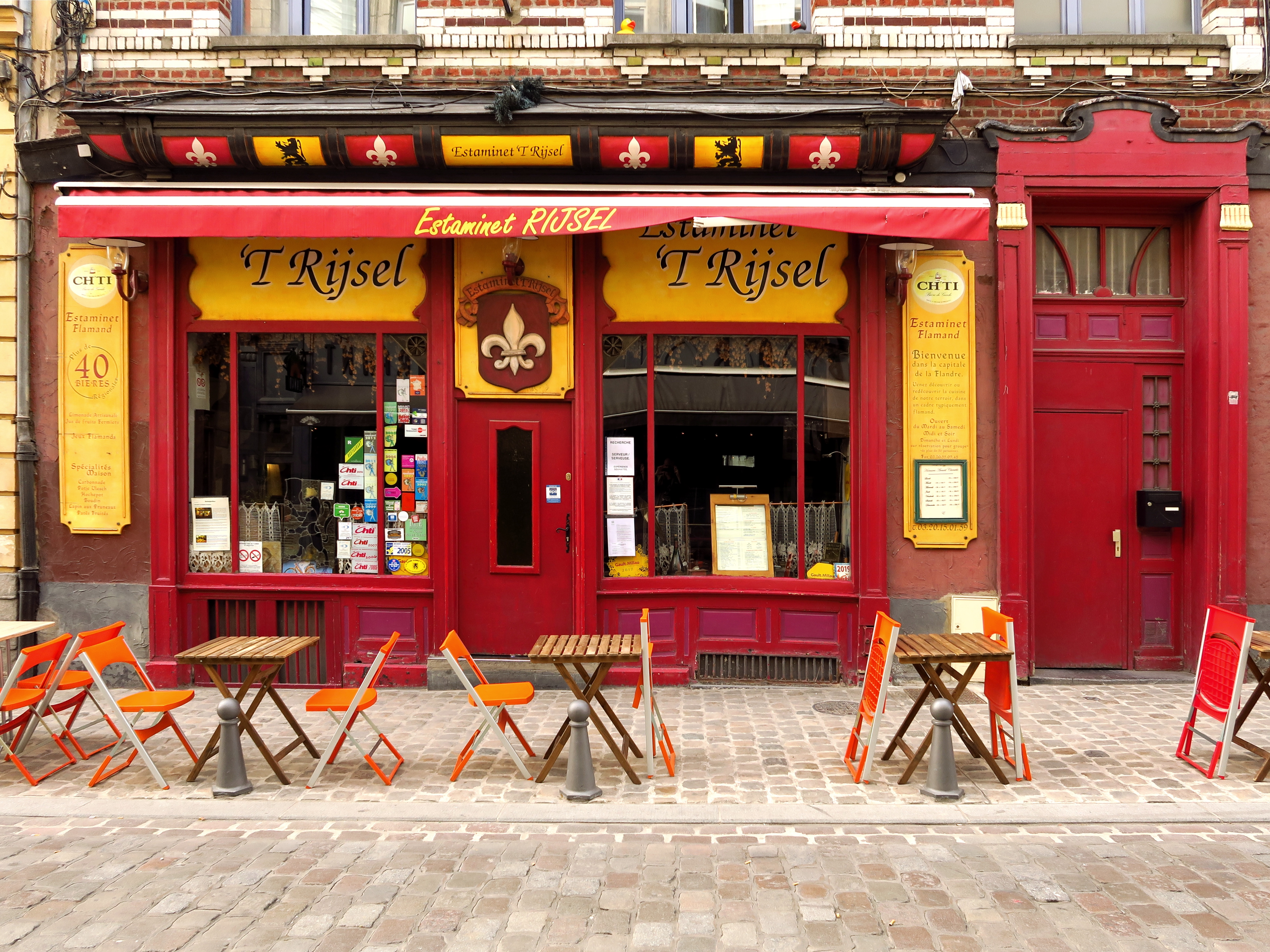
Estaminet 'T Rijsel in Lille, Nord, France.

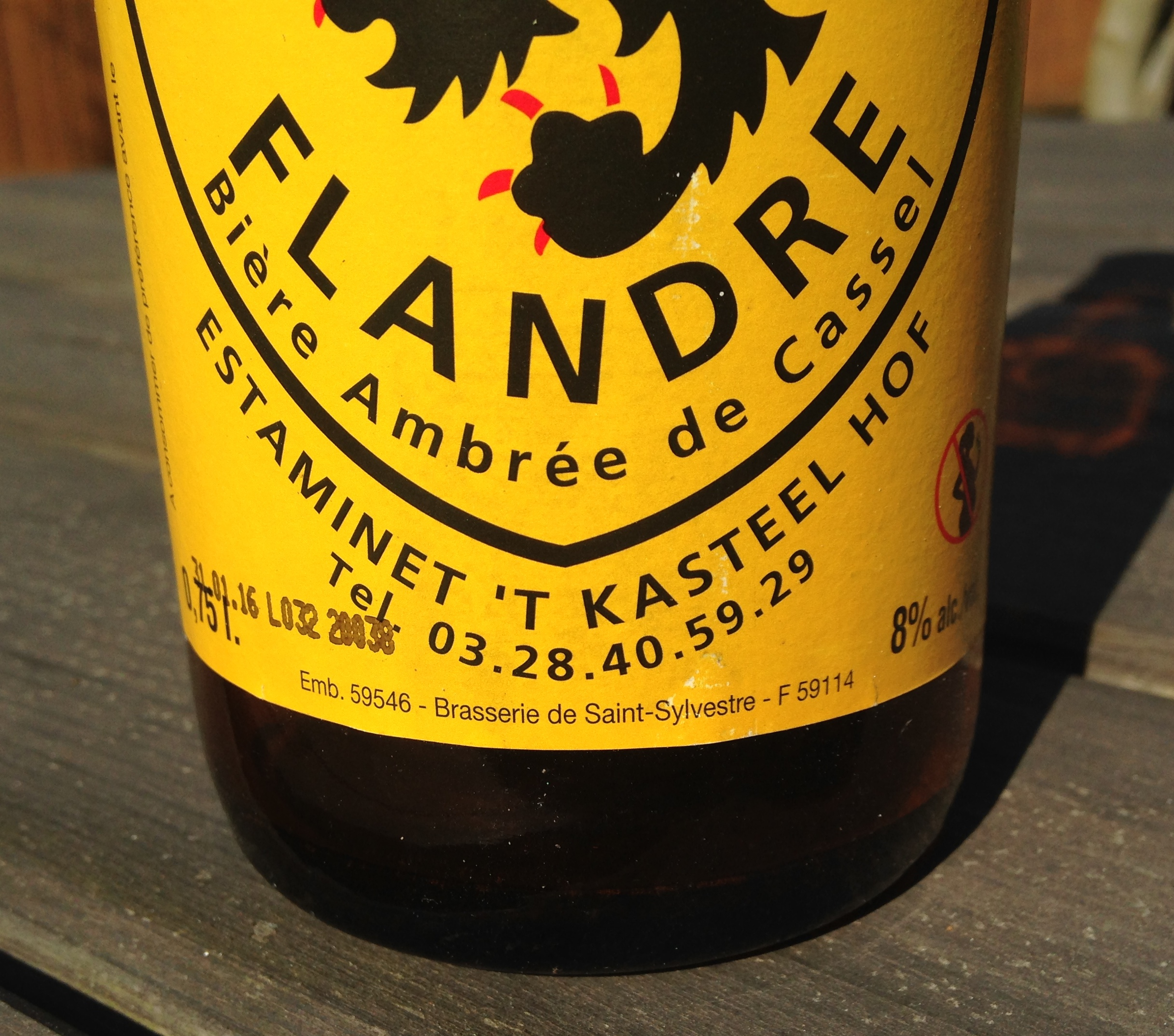
Close up of a bottle of Kassels Bier, the "House Beer" of the Estaminet 'T Kasteel Hof, in Cassel, Nord, France, showing brewery (Brasserie de Saint-Sylvestre).

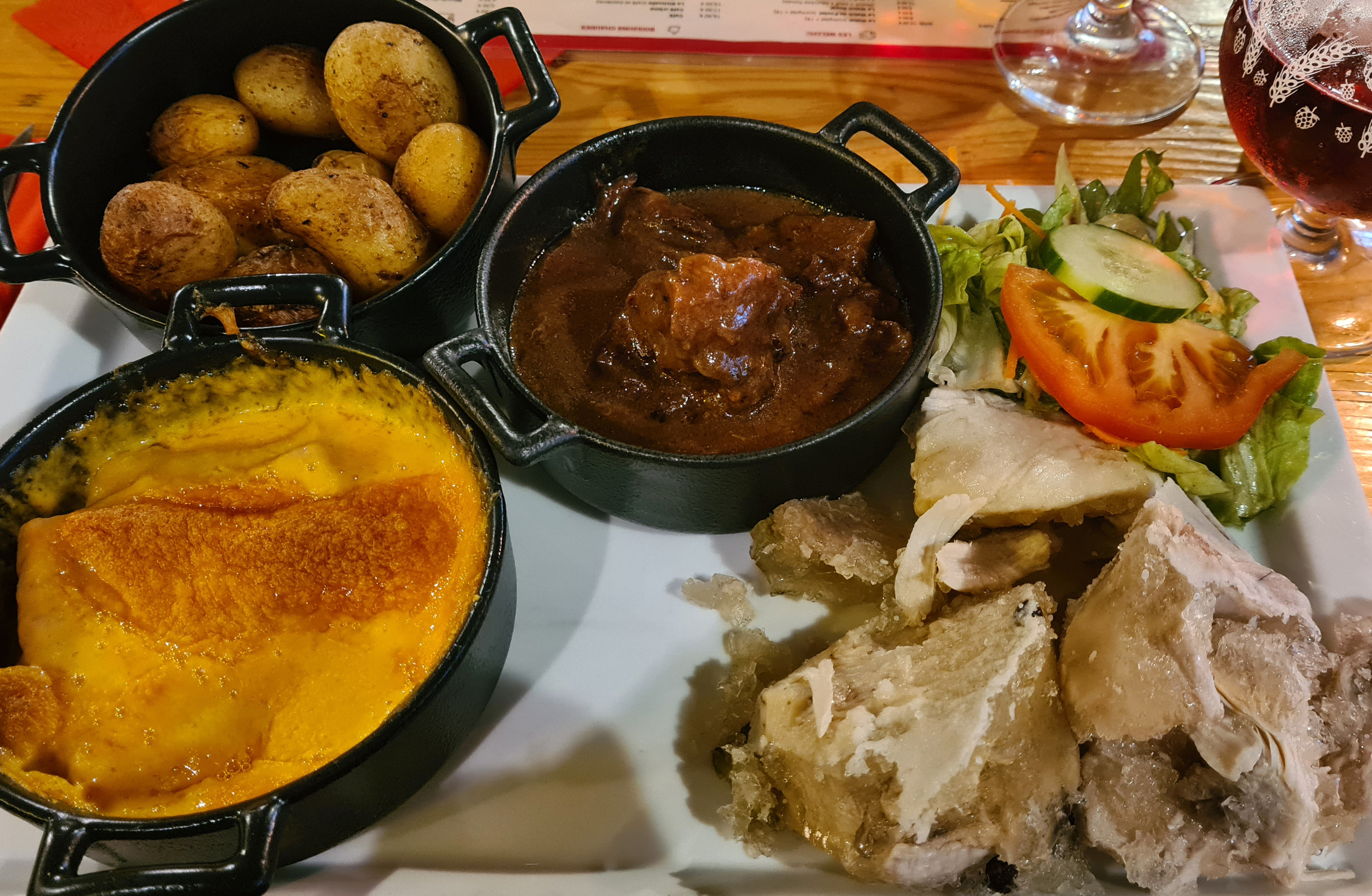
Dishes served in an estaminet in Lille (potatoes, carbonade flamande, welsch, potjevleesch).
Estaminets in art
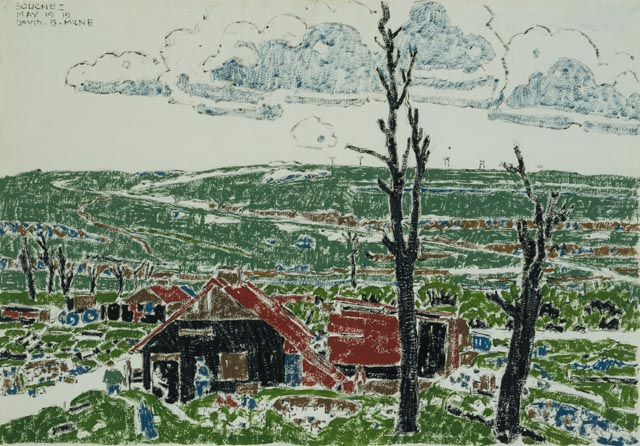
Vimy Ridge from Souchez, Estaminet among the Ruins, 1919, by David Milne, National Gallery of Canada.

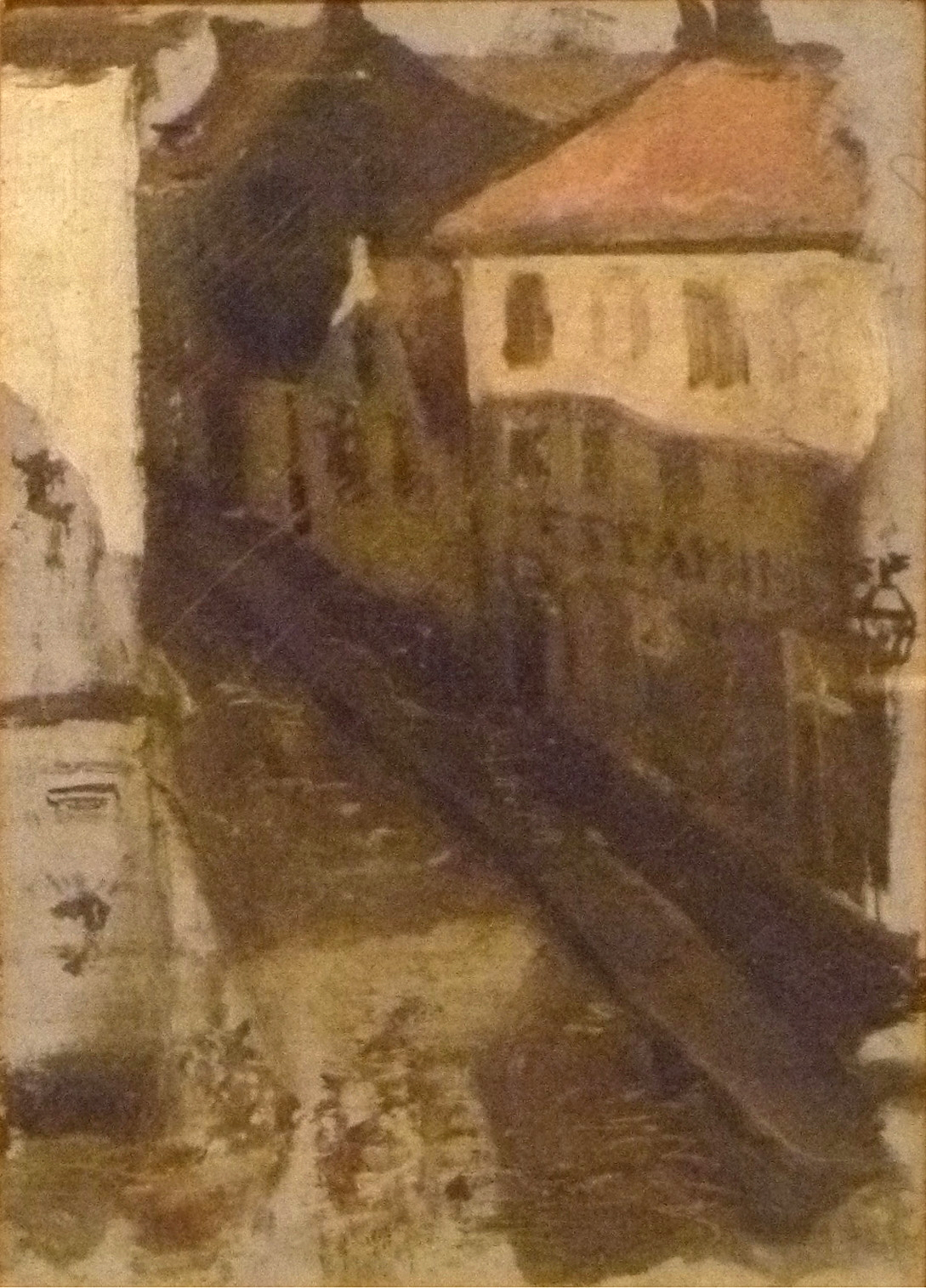
Estaminet, painting by James Ensor (1875 ca).

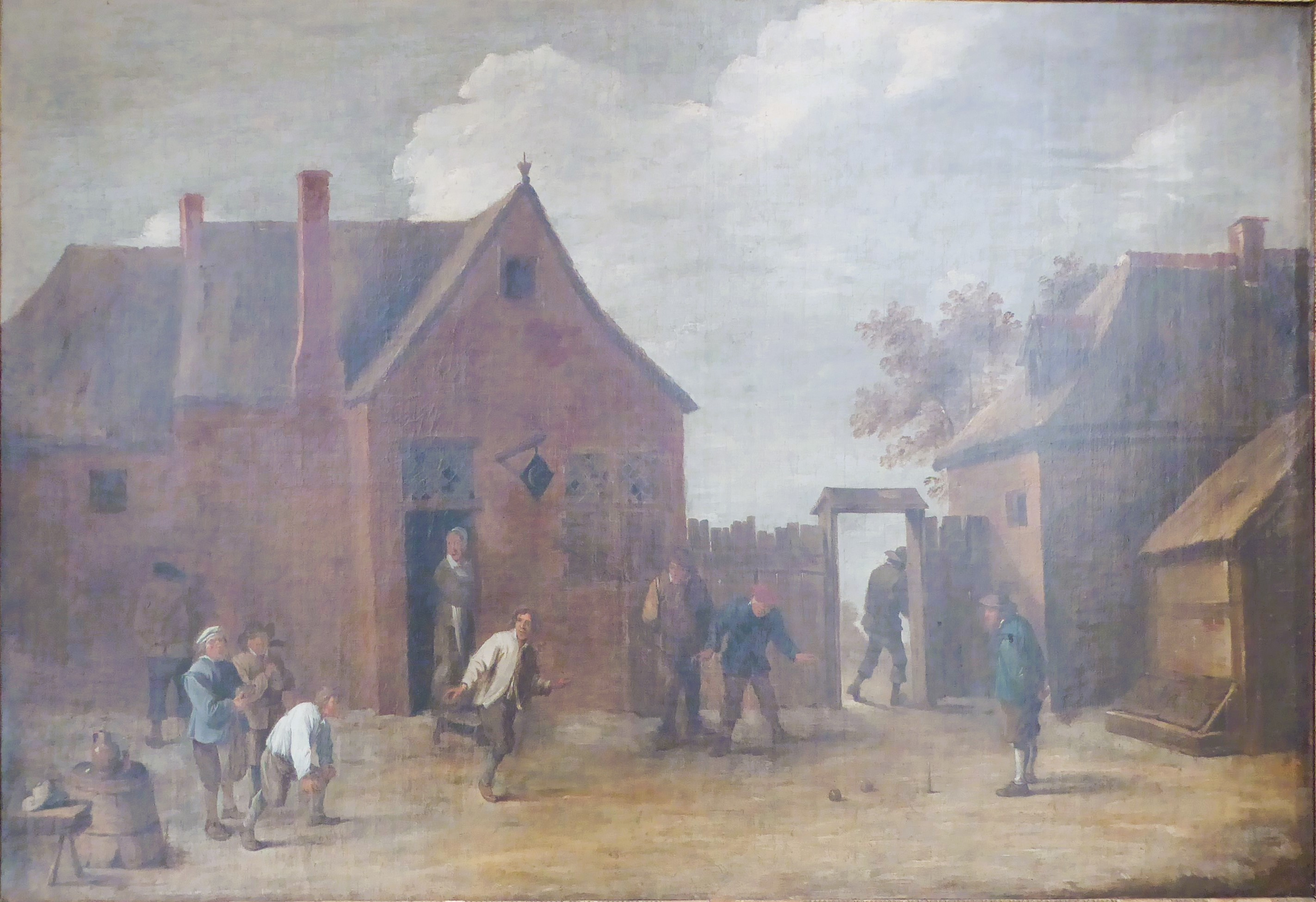
Boules players in the yard of an estaminet, by David Teniers the Younger.

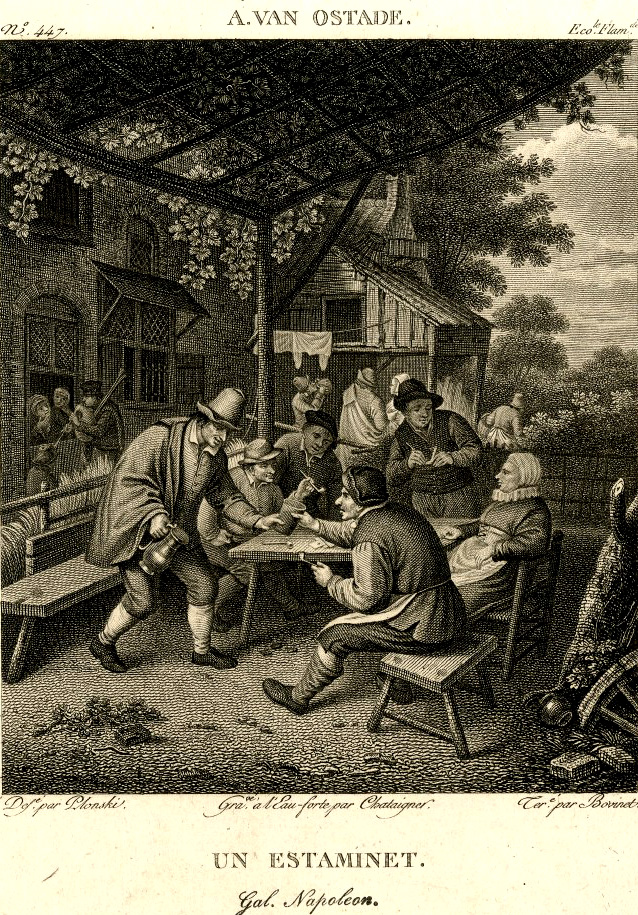
Un estaminet - engraving by Edme Bovinet after Adriaen van Ostade.

== See also ==
- French cuisine
- Cuisine and specialties of Nord-Pas-de-Calais

== Notes and references ==
=== Bibliography ===
- In 1886, the publisher Ravet-Anceau established the first inventory of estaminets in his Annuaire du Nord. Since 2005, estaminets from northern France and Belgium are listed in the Guide Ravet-Anceau des estaminets, described as the Bible of estaminets in 2013 (Gilles Guillon, Pôle Nord Editions).
- Giuseppe Salvaggio, De A à Zinc. 700 mots pour y boire. Précis de sociolexicologie, Strépy-Bracquegnies, Le Livre en papier, 2021, 476 p. ISBN 978-2-9602-5311-5 - Pages 217 to 228 are dedicated to the etymology of the word "estaminet" ISBN 978-2-9602-5310-8).
- Dominique Lobjois, Jeux d'estaminets de Flandre, préface de Jacques Messiant, Éditions Engelaere, 2016, 176 p. ISBN 978-2-9176-2138-7.
- Estaminets et cafés. Histoires bruxelloises 2018 BruxellesFabriques = Brusselfabriek.
