= Adam Billaut =

French carpenter, poet and singer

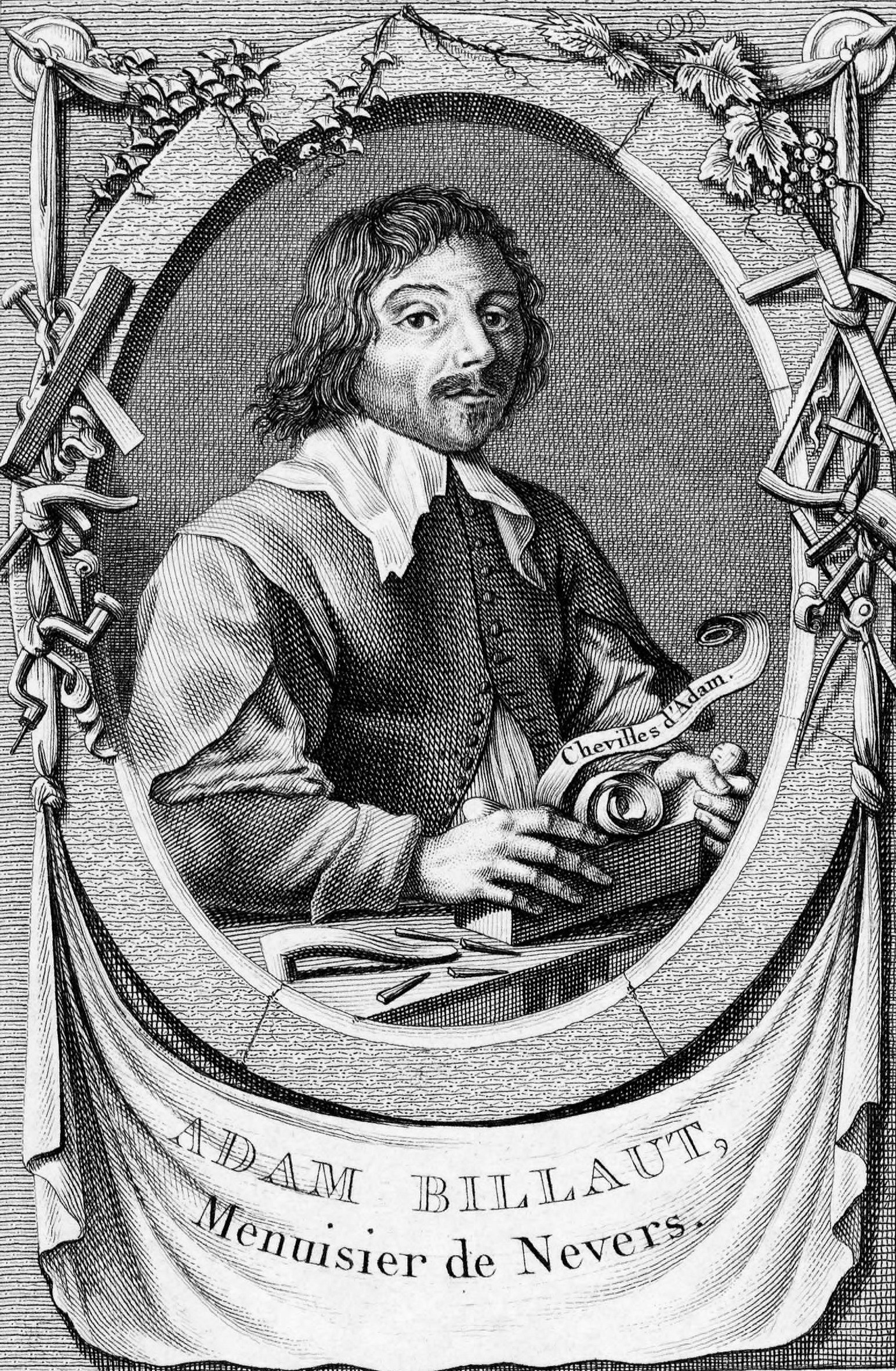
French carpenter and poet Adam Billaut by Edme Bovinet, Bibliothèque nationale de France, 1790

Adam Billaut (31 January 1602 – 18 May 1662) was a French carpenter, poet and singer. Nicknamed "the Virgil of rabot" he is considered one of the first poet-workers.

Billaut divided his time between Paris, where he met Antoine Girard de Saint-Amant, Guillaume Colletet, Paul Scarron and Michel de Marolles, and Nevers, where he married Catherine Renard in 1630. He received patronage from Marie Louise Gonzaga and the Prince of Condé, and he was also pensioned by Cardinal Richelieu.

He wrote a number of books, including Les Chevilles, which enjoyed some critical success when it was published in 1644, Le Vilebrequin, published posthumously in 1663, and Le Rabot, which was never printed.

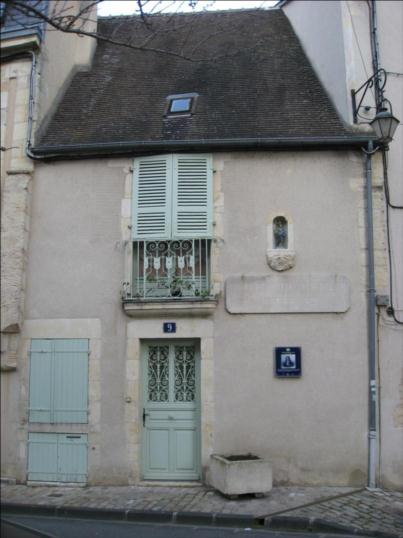
Home where Adam Billaut lived while in Nevers

== Principal publications ==
- Ode à Monseigneur le cardinal duc de Richelieu, par le menuisier de Nevers, 1639
- Les Chevilles de maître Adam, menuisier de Nevers, préface de l'abbé de Marolles, 1644
- Stances de maître Adam au parc de Nevers, sur le départ de la sérénissime reine de Pologne, 1645
- Ode pour monseigneur le Prince, par maître Adam, menuisier de Nevers, 1648
- Le Vilebrequin de maître Adam, menuisier de Nevers, contenant toutes sortes de poésies gallantes, tant en sonnets, épîtres, épigrammes, élégies, madrigaux, que stances et autres pièces, 1663
- Poésies de maître Adam Billaut, 1842
- Appendice aux poésies de maître Adam, menuisier de Nevers, 1842
