= Waterzooi =

Traditional Belgian stew

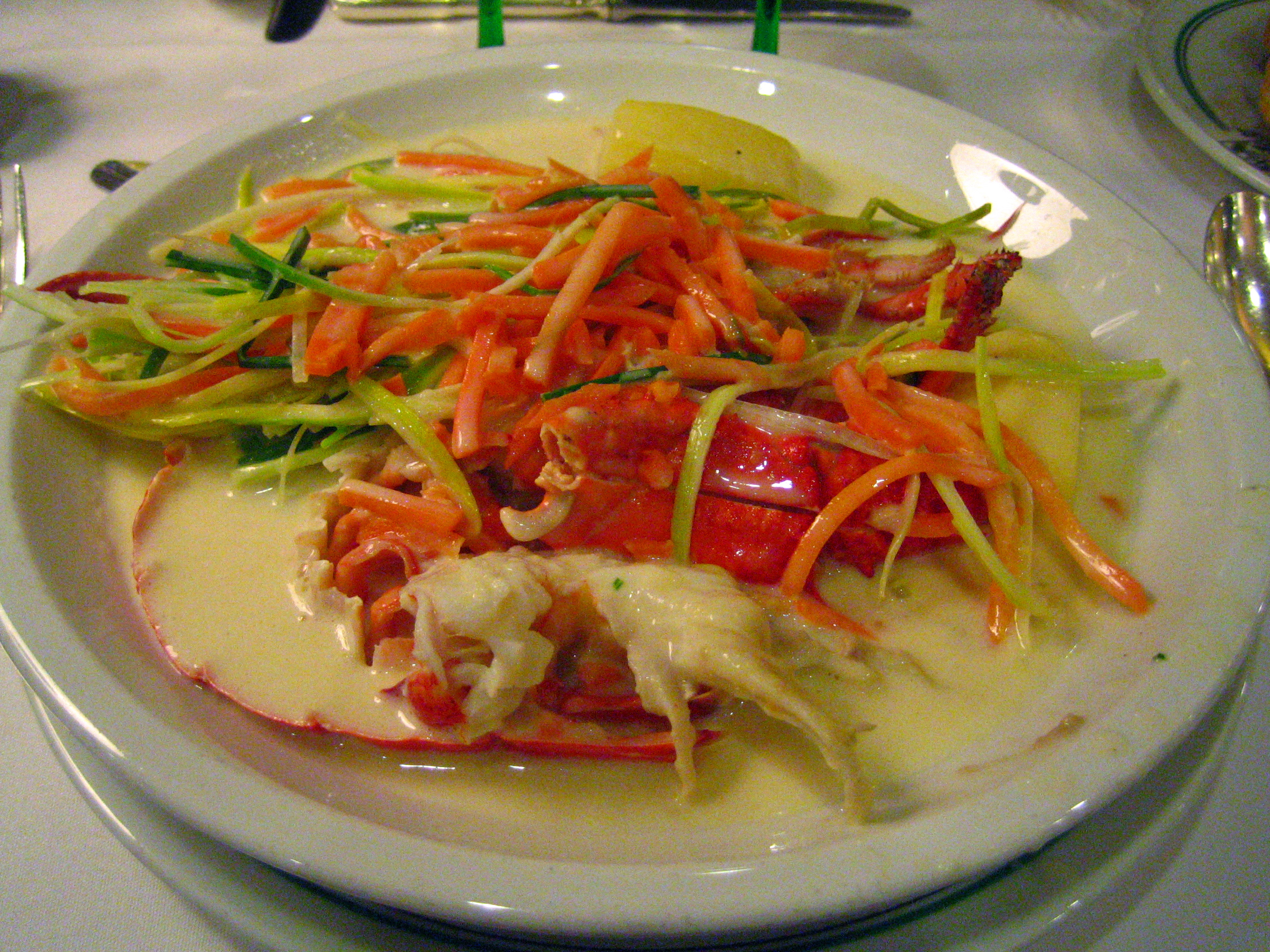
- Lobster Waterzooi garnished with vegetables
- Type: Stew
- Place of origin: Belgium
- Region or state: Flanders
- Main ingredients: Fish or chicken, vegetable broth, egg yolks, cream

Waterzooi (Dutch: [ˈʋaːtərˌzoːi]) is a soup from Belgium and originating in Flanders. The second part of the name derives from the Middle Dutch terms sode, zo(o)de and soot, words referring to the act of boiling or the ingredients being boiled. It is sometimes called Gentse Waterzooi which refers to the Belgian town of Ghent where it originated. The original dish is often made of fish, either freshwater or salt, (known as Viszooitje), though today chicken waterzooi (Kippenwaterzooi) is more common. The most accepted theory is that rivers around Ghent became too polluted and the fish there disappeared. Charles V, Holy Roman Emperor ate the rich dish, even after suffering from gout.

== Varieties ==
All versions are based on a soup-base of egg yolk, cream, and thickened vegetable broth. The stew itself contains fish or chicken, vegetables including carrots, onions, celery, leeks, potatoes and herbs such as parsley, thyme, bay-leaves and sage.

=== Fish ===
Originally, burbot was used but this fish had all but disappeared from the rivers until its recent return due to conservation efforts. Nowadays, fish such as eel, pike, carp and bass are used, though other fish such as cod, monkfish, or halibut can be used. Gentse Waterzooi van Tarbot includes turbot.

=== Meat ===
Chicken is a popular alternative to fish in the recipe, though the rest of the ingredients remain the same.

== See also ==
- Belgian cuisine
- List of stews
