= Edme Bovinet =

French engraver

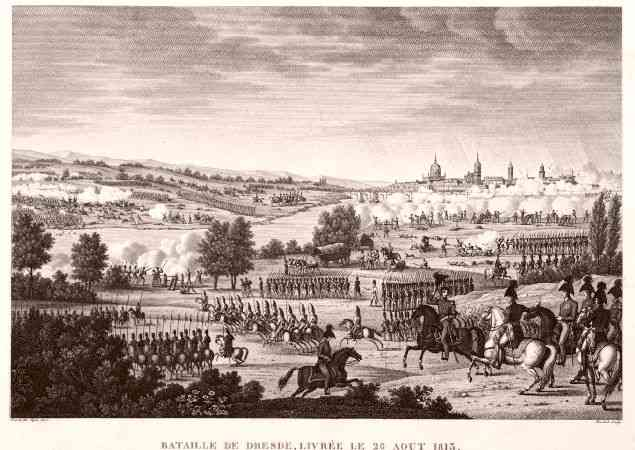
Battle of Dresden

Edme Bovinet, a French engraver, who was born at Chaumont in 1767, was a pupil of Jean-Baptiste Patas. His works are after the most eminent Italian, Dutch, and French painters; some are in the Galerie du Musée Napoléon. He died at Creil about 1832.

The best of his engravings are:

- The Campo Vaccino; after Claude Lorraine.
- The Schoolmaster; after Ostade.
- Orpheus and Eurydice; after Poussin.

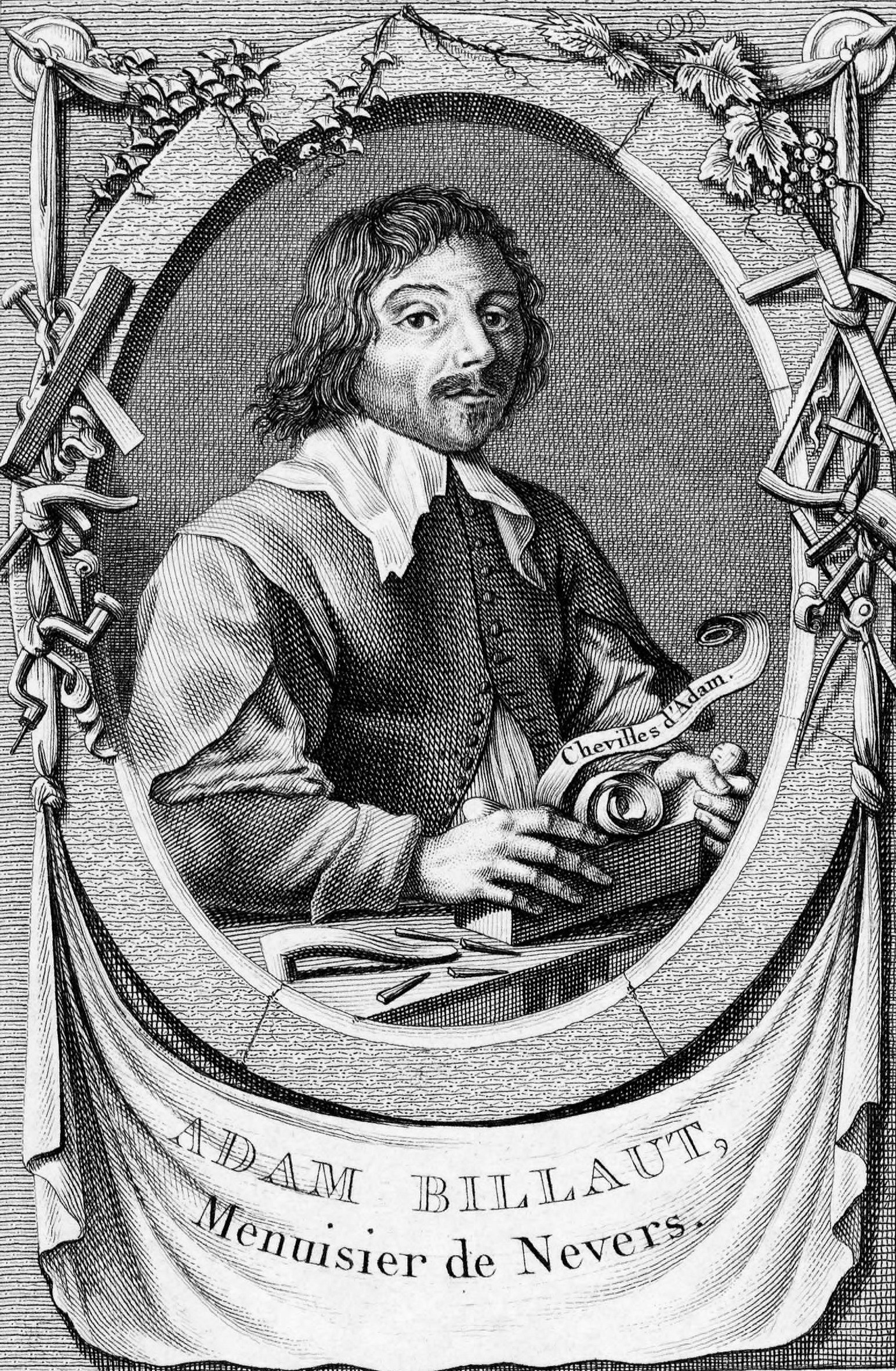
Portrait of French carpenter and poet Adam Billaut (1602–1662), engraving from 1790.
