= Mont des Cats cheese =

French cheese

Mont des Cats
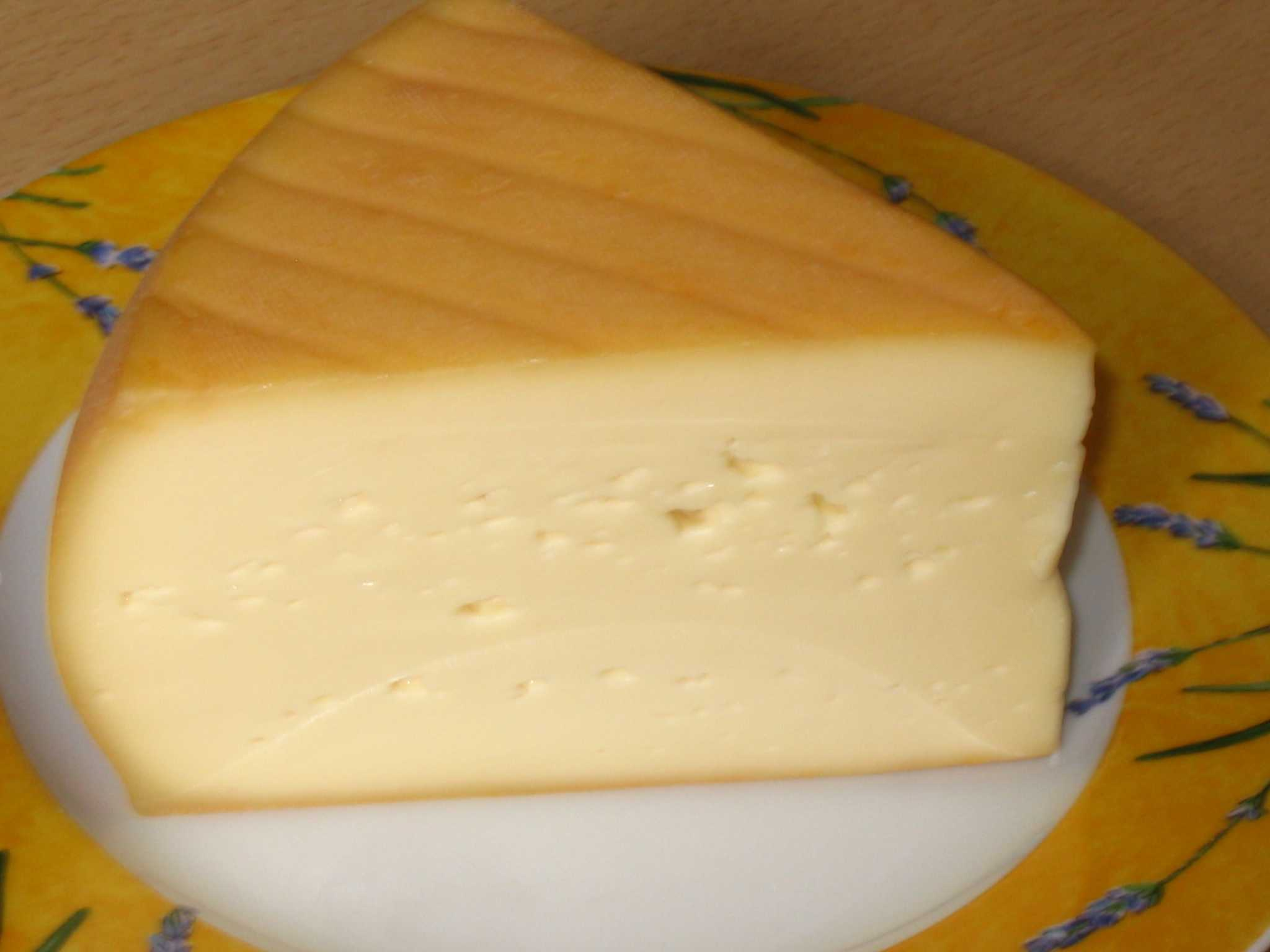
- Region: France
- Town: Mont des Cats
- Source of milk: Cow's milk
- Fat content: 50%
- Aging time: min. 2 months
- Named after: Mont des Cats

Trappist monks started producing Mont des Cats (French pronunciation: [mɔ̃ de ka]) cheeses in 1890. The cheese is produced using cows milk from local sources and has a fat content of 50%. While maturing for at least two months the cheese is washed with salted water containing a dye made from annatto seeds which gives the rind its characteristic orange color.
