= Potjevleesch =

French Flemish dish

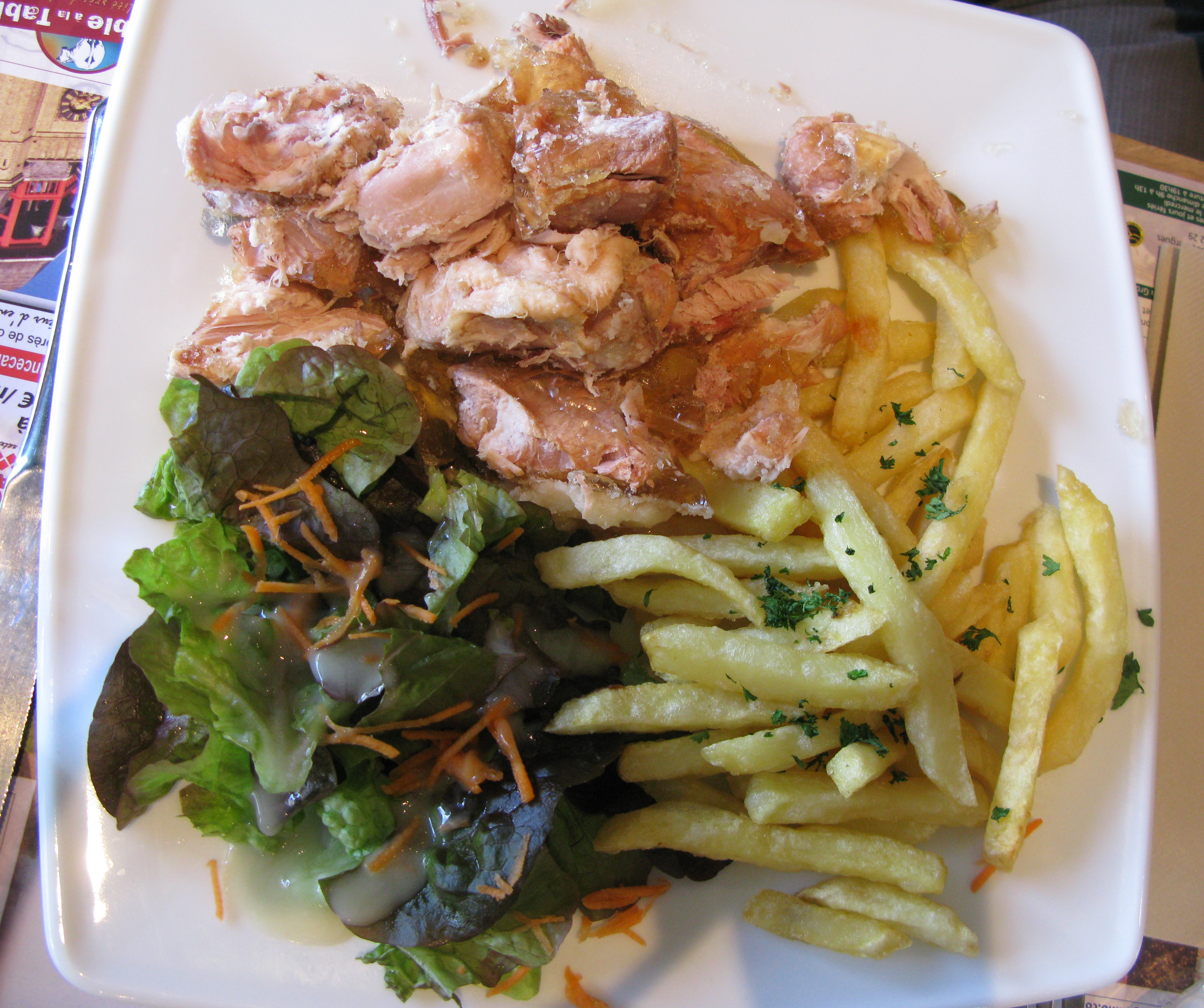
- Course: Potjevleesch with french fries
- Place of origin: France
- Region or state: Nord-Pas-de-Calais
- Serving temperature: Cold
- Main ingredients: Veal, pork, chicken, rabbit
- Ingredients generally used: Onions, salt, pepper, thyme and bay leaves
- Similar dishes: Terrine

Potjevleesch is a traditional French Flemish dish, which can be translated into English as "potted meat".

It is traditionally made in a ceramic dish from three or four different types of meat and held together with natural gelatin coming from the meats used. The meat, along with sliced onions, salt, pepper, thyme and bay leaves, is covered in water or a mixture of water and vinegar and then cooked either on a low heat in the oven or on a low flame on top of the stove for 3 hours. After cooking, the dish is chilled then placed in the refrigerator and served cold.

It is customary to serve it with chips on top of it for melting down the gelatin.

== See also ==
- Food preservation
