= Algérienne sauce =

Sweet and spicy sauce

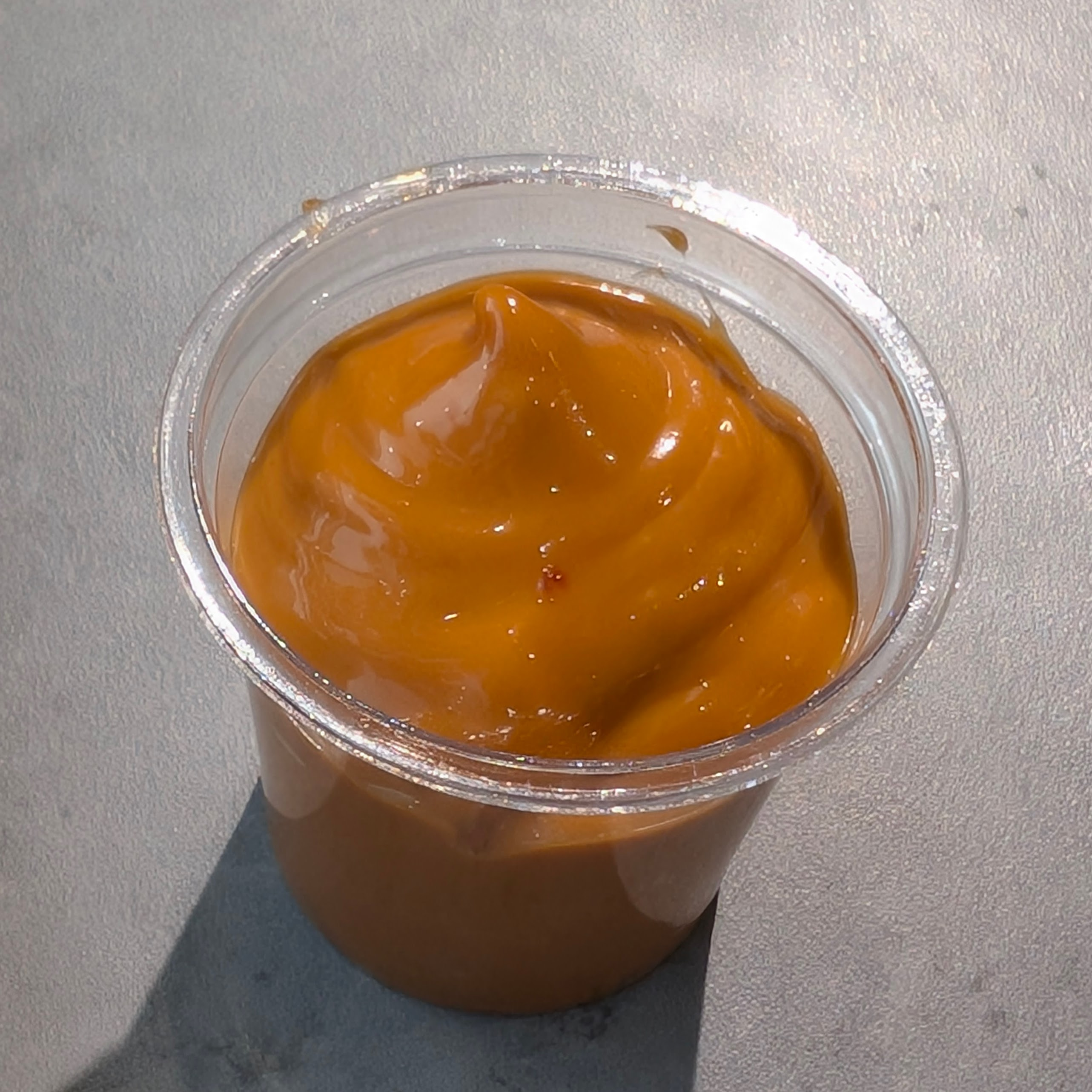
Algérienne sauce from the French fast food chain O'Tacos

Algérienne sauce or Algerian sauce is a sweet and spicy sauce with a yellowish-orange color. It is often available at fast-food businesses serving French tacos or kebabs, as well as friteries and other similar fast-food businesses, in Algeria, Tunisia, Morocco, Belgium, France, Switzerland, Japan and Québec.

== History ==
Sauce algérienne is mentioned in the 1876 book Le livre des menus authored by Fin-Bec. Ernest Loewer describes the Algerian sauce in 1962 as comprising half-sautéed tomatoes, stuffed with a julienne of peppers, and served alongside croquette potatoes.

Subsequently, numerous sauce companies, particularly in Algeria, Belgium and France, have industrialized the production of the Algerian sauce, with a focus on its use in French tacos or as a dip for fries. Similar to other industrialized sauces, the recipes for Algerian sauce have diversified, with each sauce company incorporating its own distinctive blend and resulting in variations in spiciness, sweetness, and texture.

== Description ==
Algérienne sauce has traditionally been prepared with mayonnaise ingredients (oil, egg yolk), to which are added mustard, shallot, black pepper, vinegar, and chili pepper or harissa, and sometimes also tomato or tomato sauce, anchovies, capers, etc. Algérienne sauce is associated with French tacos.

== See also ==
- Samurai sauce
- Sauce andalouse
