= Afghan cuisine =

Culinary traditions of Afghanistan

Afghan cuisine is the set of foods and culinary styles which are associated with Afghan culture. The cuisine is halal and mainly based on mutton, beef and poultry with rice and Afghan bread. Accompanying these are common vegetables and dairy products, such as milk, yogurt, whey, and fresh and dried fruits such as apples, apricots, grapes, bananas, oranges, plums, pomegranates, sweet melons, and raisins. The diet of most Afghans revolves around rice-based dishes, while various forms of naan are consumed with most meals. Tea is generally consumed daily in large quantities, and is a major part of hospitality. The culinary specialties reflect the nation's ethnic and geographic diversity. The national dish of Afghanistan is Kabuli pulao, a rice dish cooked with raisins, carrots, nuts, and lamb or beef.

== Background ==
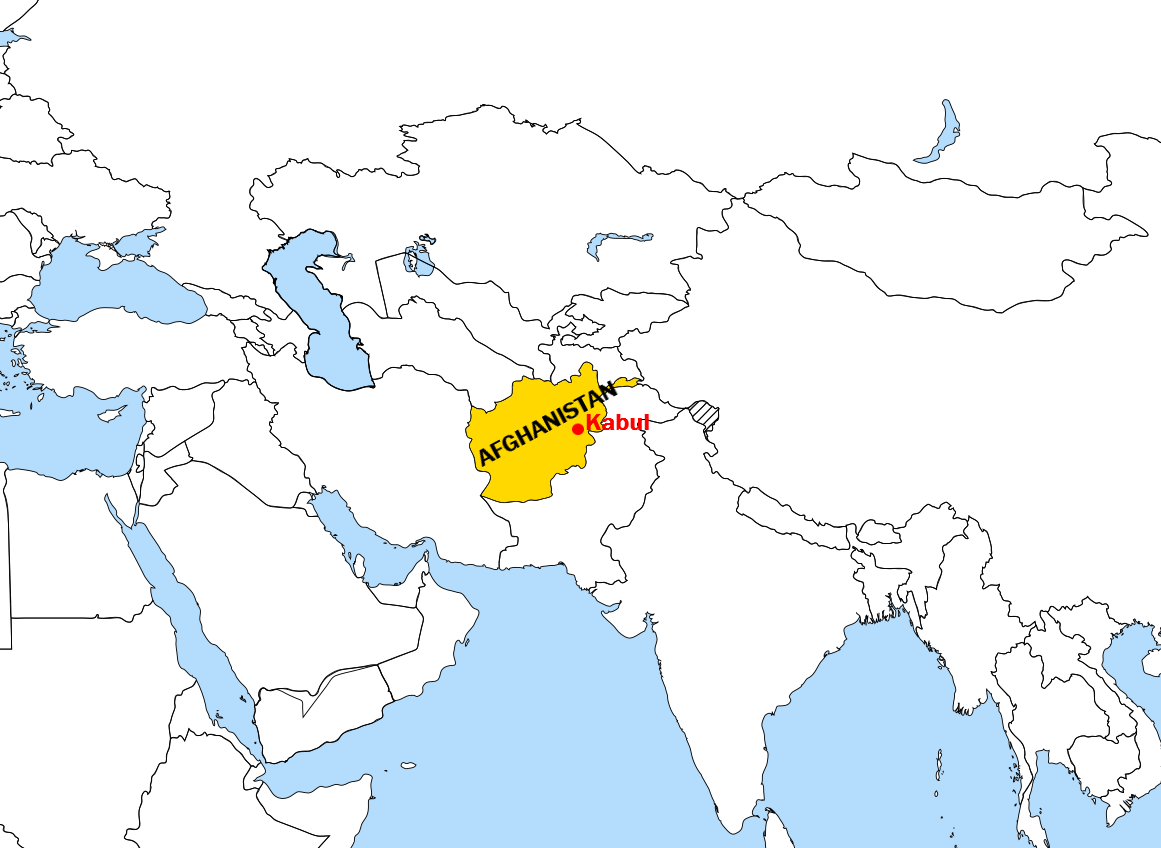
Location of Afghanistan in Asia

The cuisine of Afghanistan is halal and uses various herbs and spices including coriander, mint, dill, cumin, cardamom and turmeric as well as locally-grown saffron. Afghan dishes are typically mild in flavor.

A variety of rice dishes known locally as 'palao' are prepared with various fruits, nuts and legumes, and combine sweet and sour flavors central to Afghan cuisine. Dumpling and noodle dishes, meat and vegetable stews, legumes, and kebab dishes make up the bulk of Afghan cuisine.

== Staple foods ==
=== Rice ===
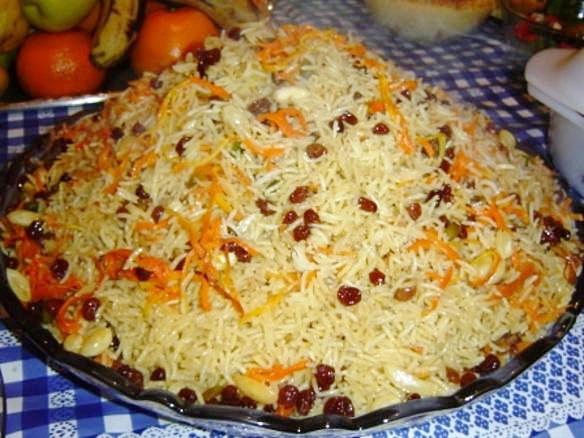
Afghan Kabuli palaw

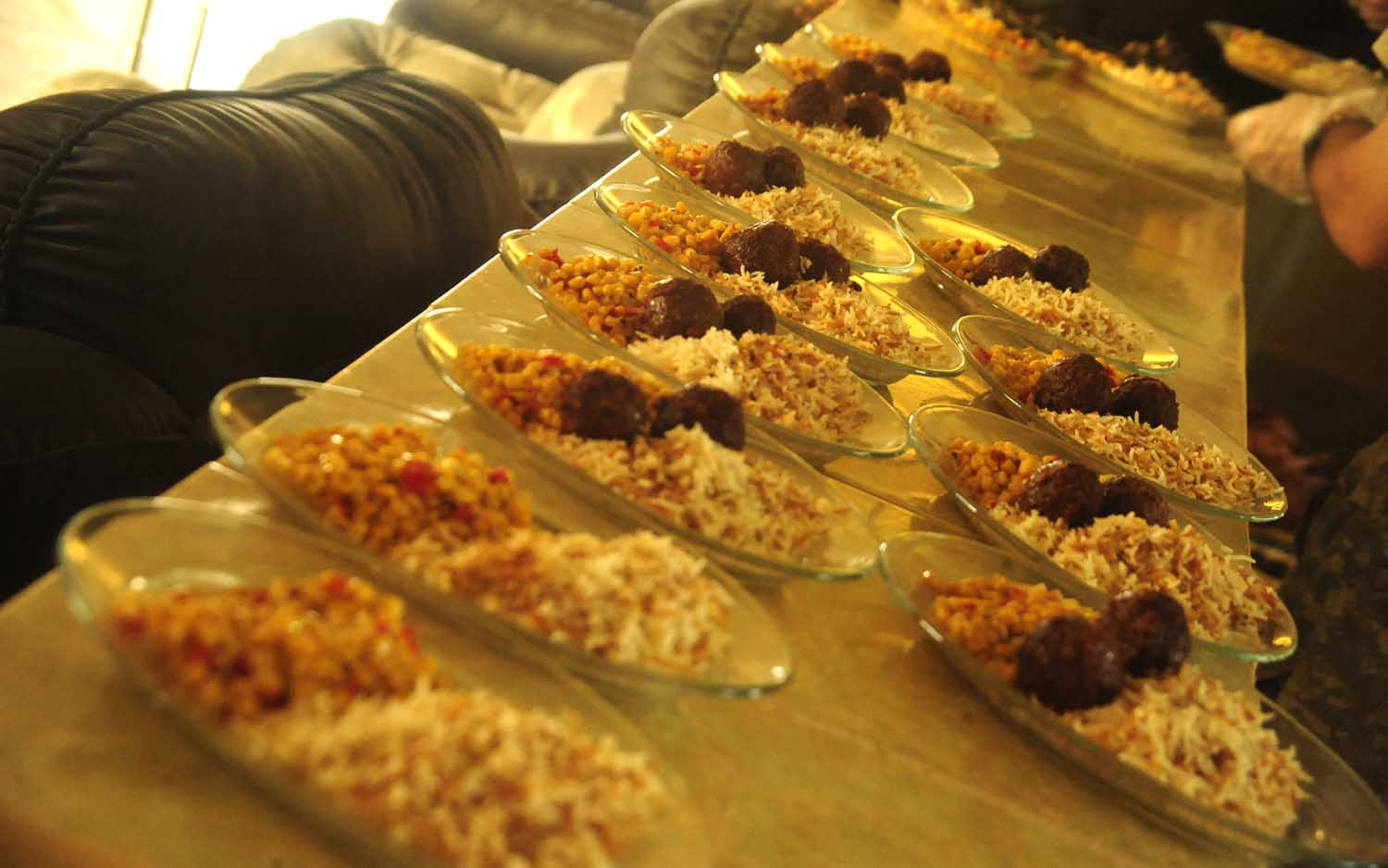
Rice with kofta (meatballs) and corn

Rice is a core staple food in Afghan cuisine and the most important part of any meal. Challow, or white rice cooked with mild spices, is served mainly with qormas (korma: stews or casseroles). Palaw is cooked similarly to challow, but a combination of meat, stock, qorma, and herbs are also mixed in before baking, resulting in the elaborate colors, flavors, and aromas from which the rice got its name. Sometimes caramelized sugar is used to give the rice a rich brown color. Examples of palaw include:

- Qabeli palao (the national dish) – meat and stock are added, plus a topping of fried raisins, slivered carrots, and pistachios
- Zamarod palao – Spinach, dill and sometimes other green herbs are mixed in before the cooking process, hence zamarod, meaning "emerald"
- Bore palao – lawand is added giving the rice a yellow color
- Landi palao – a traditional meal of rice (with stock made from chicken or mutton that has been salted and dried in the sun)
- Bonjan-e-roomi palao – bonjan-e-roomi (tomato qorma) is added during baking giving the rice a red color
- Narenj palao – a sweet elaborate rice dish made with saffron, orange peel, pistachios, almonds, and chicken
- Mash palao – a strictly vegetarian sweet-and-sour pilaf baked with mung beans, apricots, and bulgur wheat
- Albalo palao – a sweet rice dish with sour cherries

=== Afghan bread ===
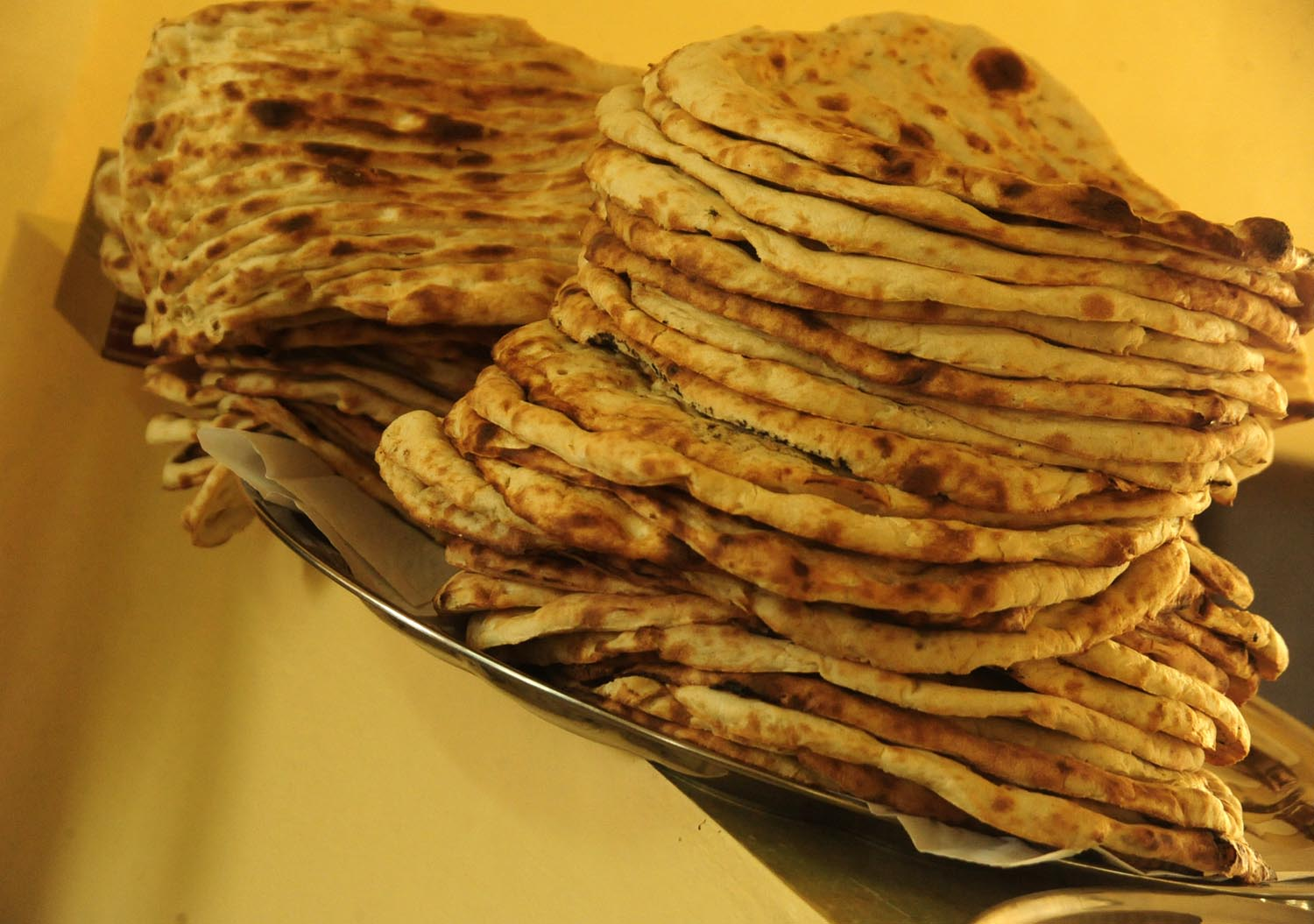
Naan (bread) from a local baker, the most widely consumed bread in Afghanistan

Afghan bread is flat and cooked in a tanoor or tandoor (a vertical ground clay oven). The bread is slapped onto a stone wall to cook. Tabakhai is a flatbread cooked on a flat upside-down pan.

== Major dishes ==
=== Steamed dumplings ===
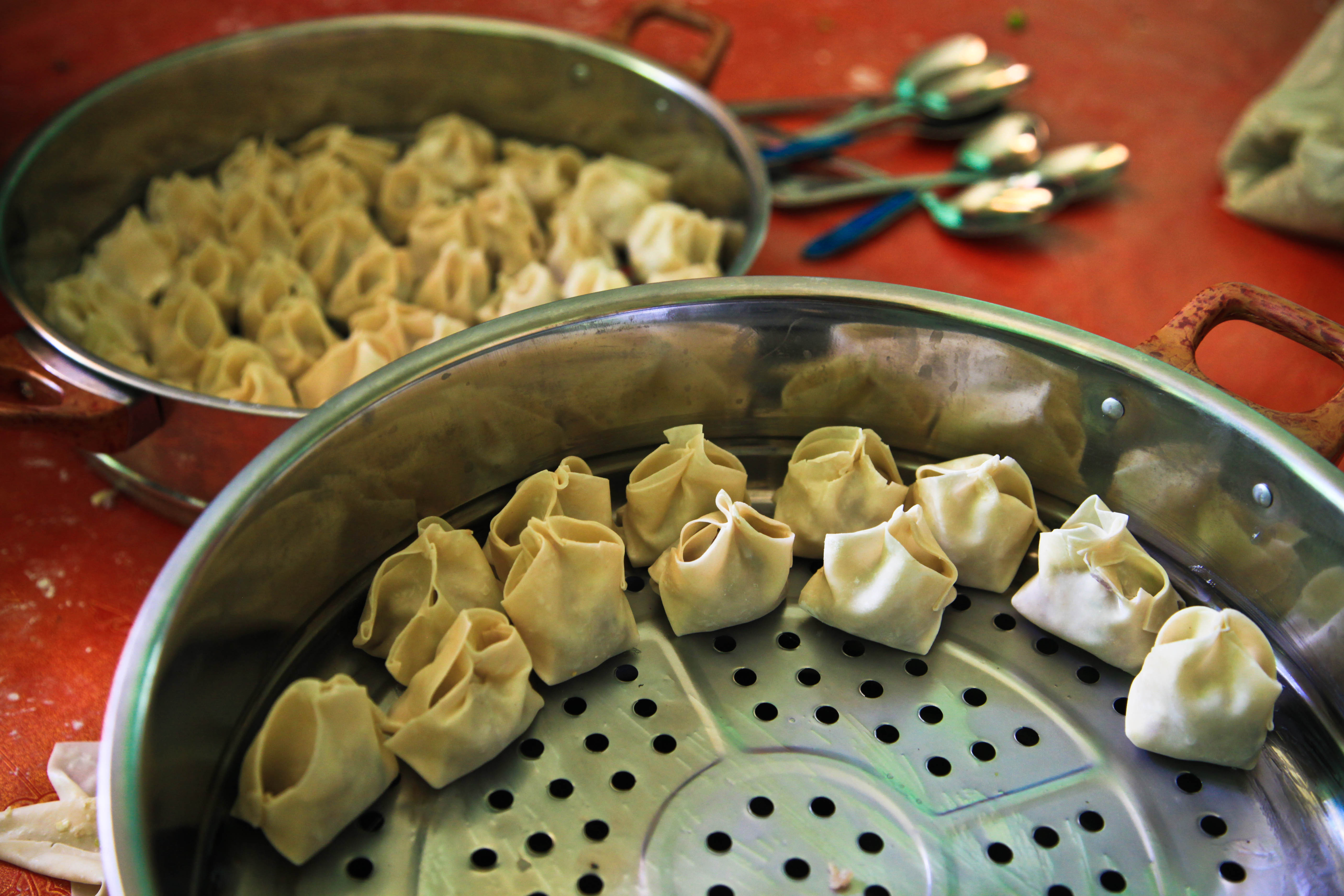
Mantu in a steamer before cooking

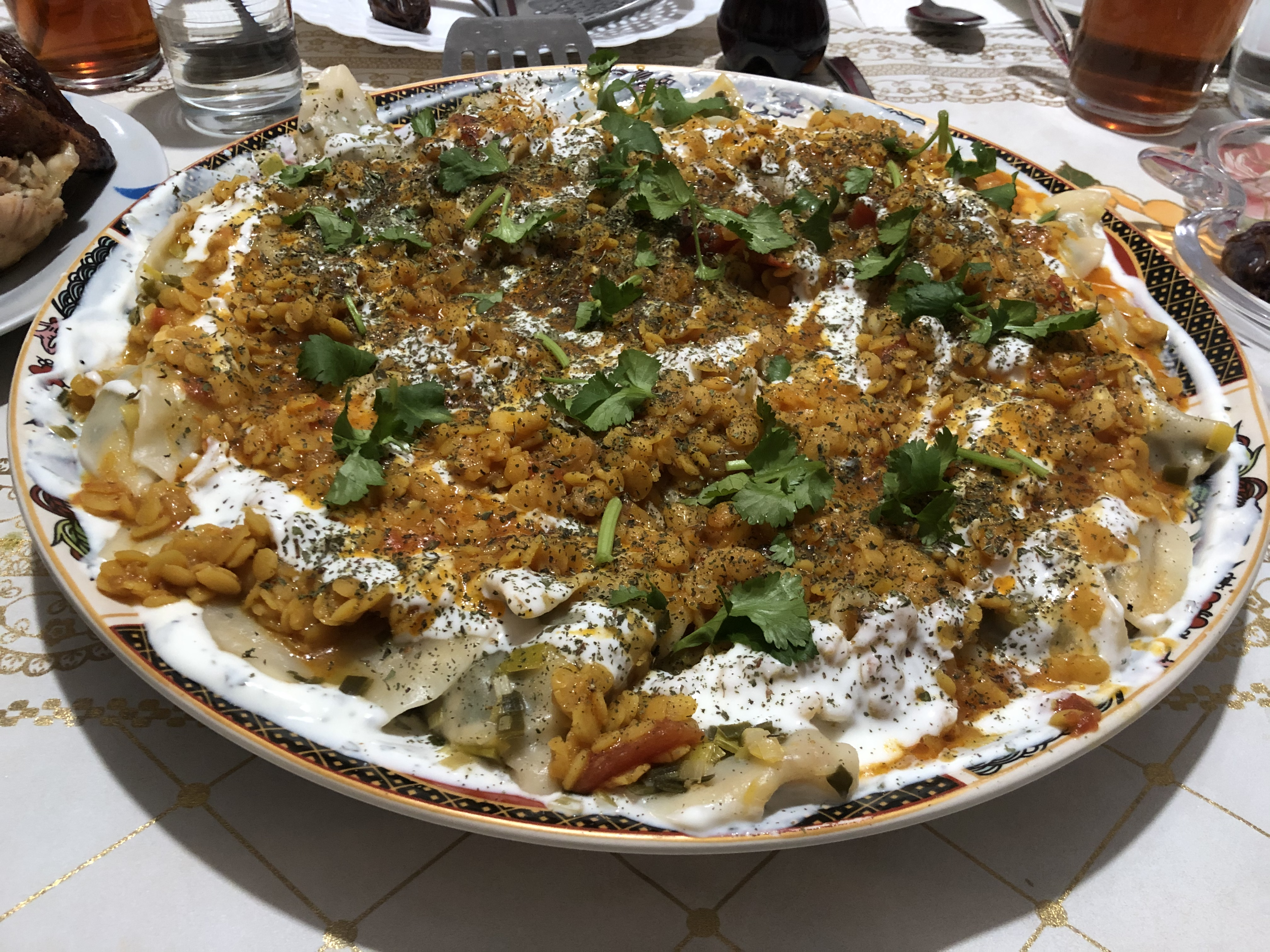
Afghan aushak

There is a wide variety of dumplings. Known under the name khameerbob and often eaten as dumplings, they are rarely served at large gatherings, such as weddings. They are instead served on special occasions at home.

- Aushak – dumplings filled with a mixture consisting mainly of leeks, topped with either garlic-mint qoroot or a garlic yogurt sauce, sautéed tomatoes, red kidney beans, and a well-seasoned ground-meat mixture. It is a dish associated with Kabul, the capital of Afghanistan.
- Mantu – steamed dumplings filled with onion and ground beef or lamb, usually topped with a tomato- and yogurt- or qoroot-based sauce and then garnished with dried mint and coriander. The yogurt-based topping is usually a mixture of yogurt, garlic, and split chickpeas. The qoroot-based sauce is made of goat's cheese and also mixed with garlic; a qoroot and yogurt mixture is sometimes used.

=== Qormah ===
Qormah (also spelled "korma" or "qorma") is an onion- and tomato-based stew or casserole usually served with challow rice. First, onion is caramelized, for a richly colored stew. Then tomato is added, along with a variety of fruits, spices, and vegetables, depending on the recipe. The main ingredient, which can be meat or other vegetables, is added last. There are hundreds of different types of qormahs including:

- Qormah e gosht (meat qormah) – usually the main qormah served with palaw at gatherings
- Qormah e alou bokhara – onion-based using veal or chicken, sour plums, lentils, and cardamom
- Qormah e nadroo – onion-based, using lamb meat or veal, yogurt, lotus roots, cilantro, and coriander
- Qormah e lawand – onion-based, using chicken, lamb, or beef, plus yogurt, turmeric, and cilantro
- Qormah e sabzi – lamb, sautéed spinach, cilantro and other greens with fenugreek; sometimes kidney beans are included
- Qormah e shalgham – onion-based using lamb, turnips, and sugar (sweet and sour taste)

=== Kabob ===
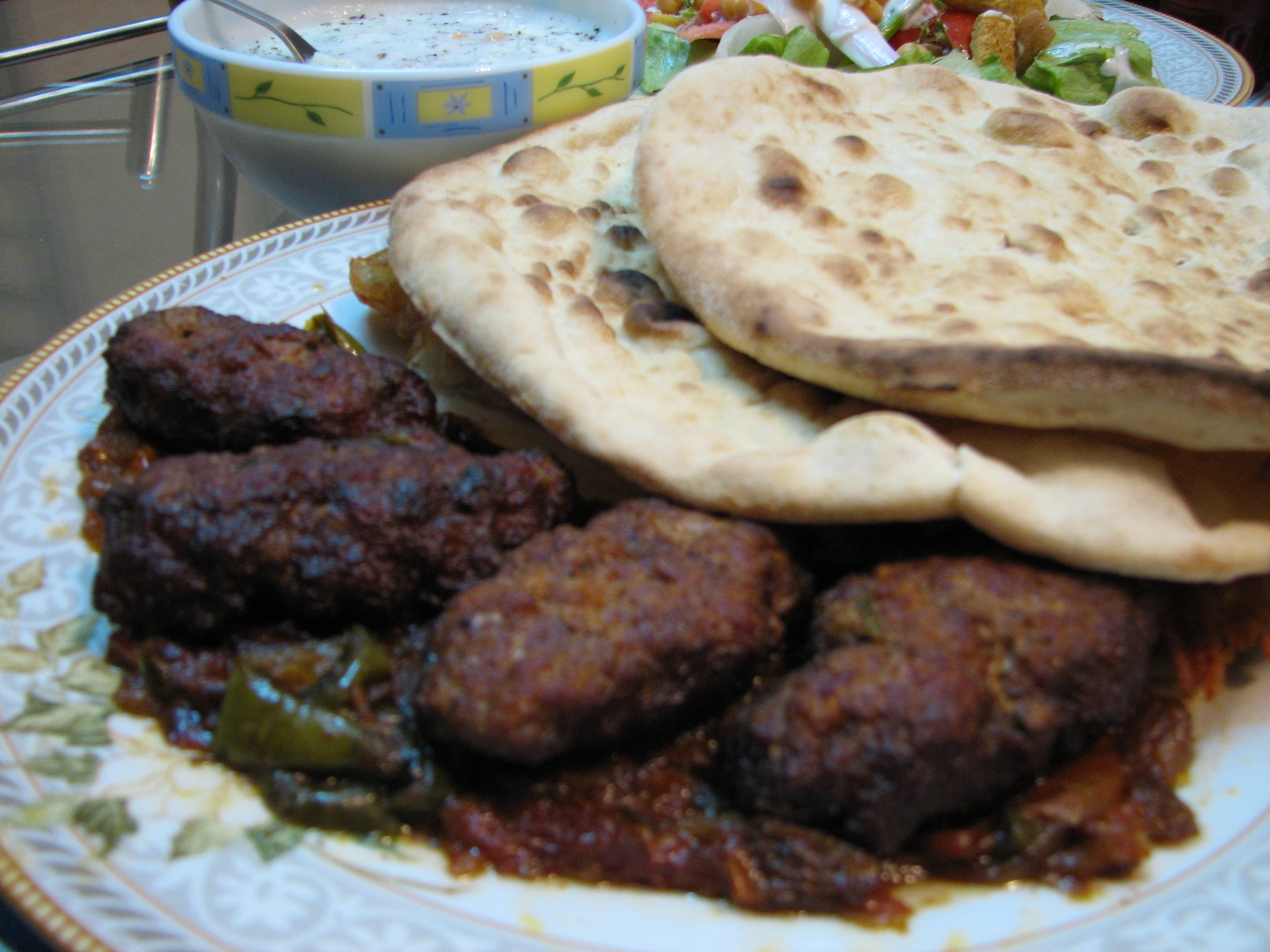
Kofta kabob with naan

Afghan kabob is most often found in restaurants and at outdoor street vendor stalls. Most of the time, it contains lamb meat. Kabob is made with naan instead of rice. Customers have the option to sprinkle sumac or ghore angoor (dried ground sour grapes) on their kabob. Pieces of fat from the sheep's tail (jijeq) are usually added to the skewers to add extra flavor. Traditional Afghan kabobs are made with onion juice, lemon, yoghurt, black pepper and sometimes saffron for chicken.

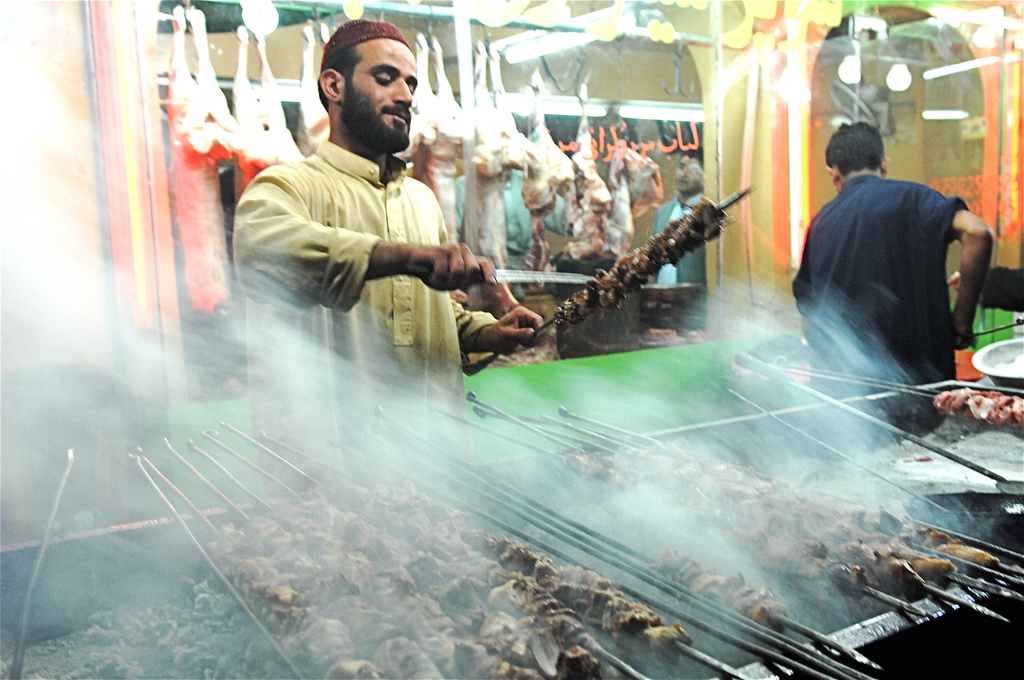
Chopan kabob being prepared

Other popular kabobs include the lamb chop, ribs, kofta (ground beef), and chicken.

Chapli kebab, a specialty of eastern Afghanistan, is a patty of minced beef. It is a popular barbecue meal in Afghanistan. It is prepared flat and round and served with naan. The original recipe of chapli kabob dictates a half-meat, half-flour mixture which renders it lighter in taste and less expensive. This type of kabob contains herbs and sometimes chilli.

=== Chicken ===
Afghan chicken or murgh-e is a classic example of one of the most famous dishes of Afghanistan. Chicken dishes are usually found in restaurants and at outdoor street vendor stalls. Unlike in the Indian cooking style, chicken in Afghan cuisine is often used with the intention that it be halal. Cream, butter, and curd are customary ingredients in all chicken recipes, whether served as an appetizer or a main course.

=== Quroot ===
Quroot (or qoroot) is a reconstituted dairy product, traditionally a by-product of butter made from sheep's or goat's milk. The residual buttermilk remaining after churning butter is soured further (by keeping it at room temperature for a few days), treated with salt, and then eventually boiled. The precipitated casein is filtered through cheesecloth, pressed in order to remove liquid, and then shaped into balls; the product is thus a hard and very sour cottage cheese. Though it can be eaten raw as a savory snack, it is typically served with cooked Afghan dishes such as aushak, mantu, and kichri qoroot.

=== Miscellaneous ===
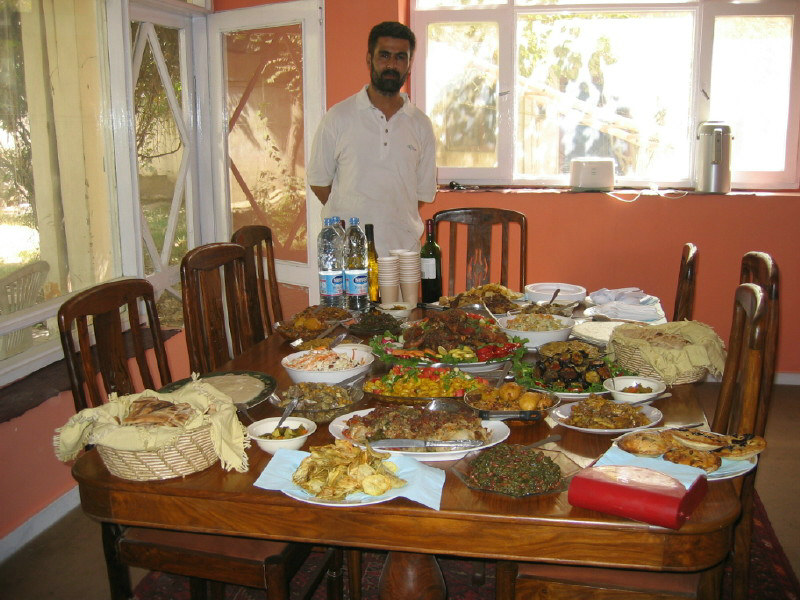
A table setting of Afghan food in Kabul

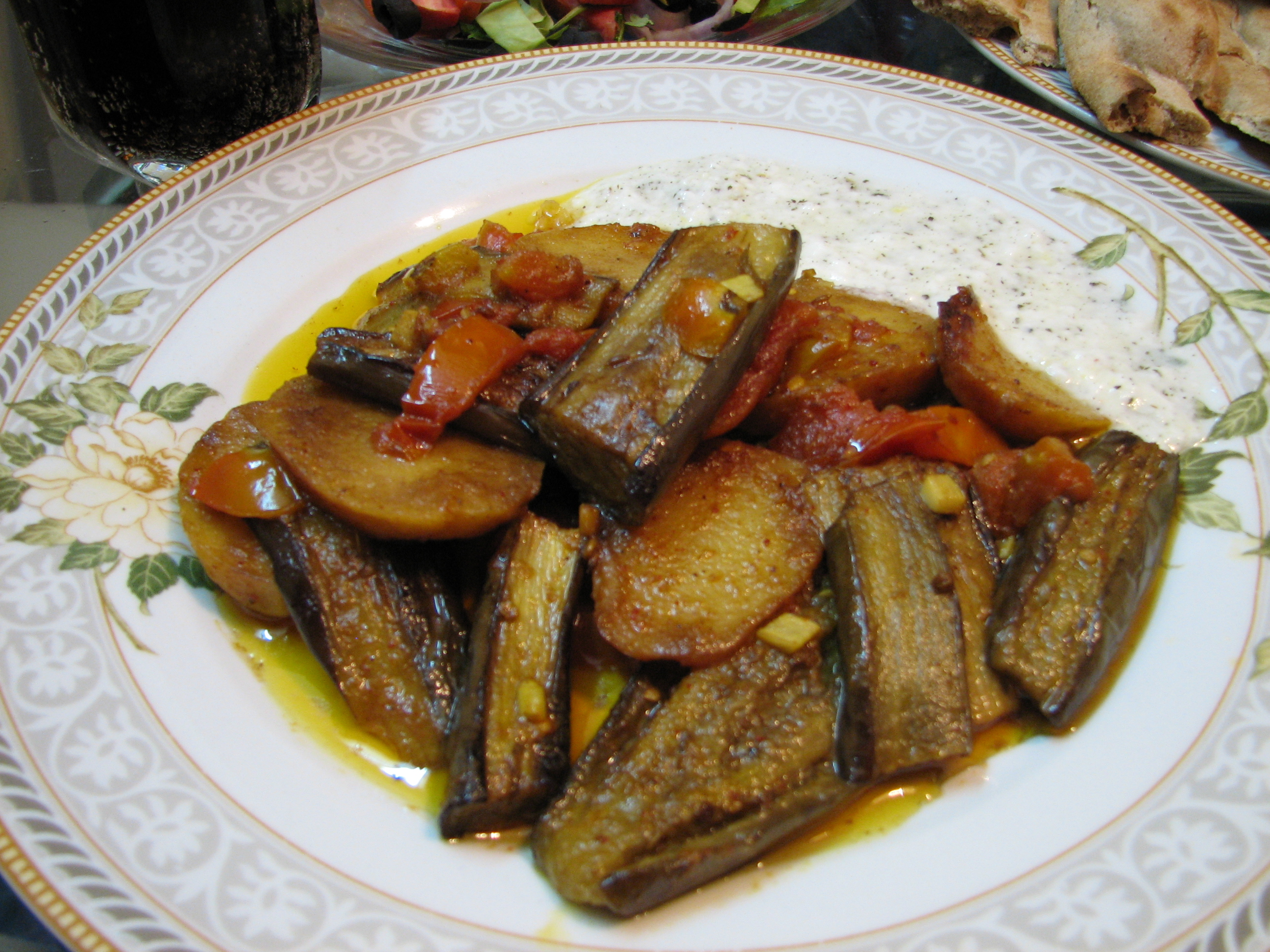
Badenjan (eggplant) is usually served for lunch as a light meal or as a side dish. It tastes best with freshly baked bread along with sour minted yogurt. Shomleh/shlombeh (a cold drink made of yogurt that is sprinkled with fresh or dried mint).

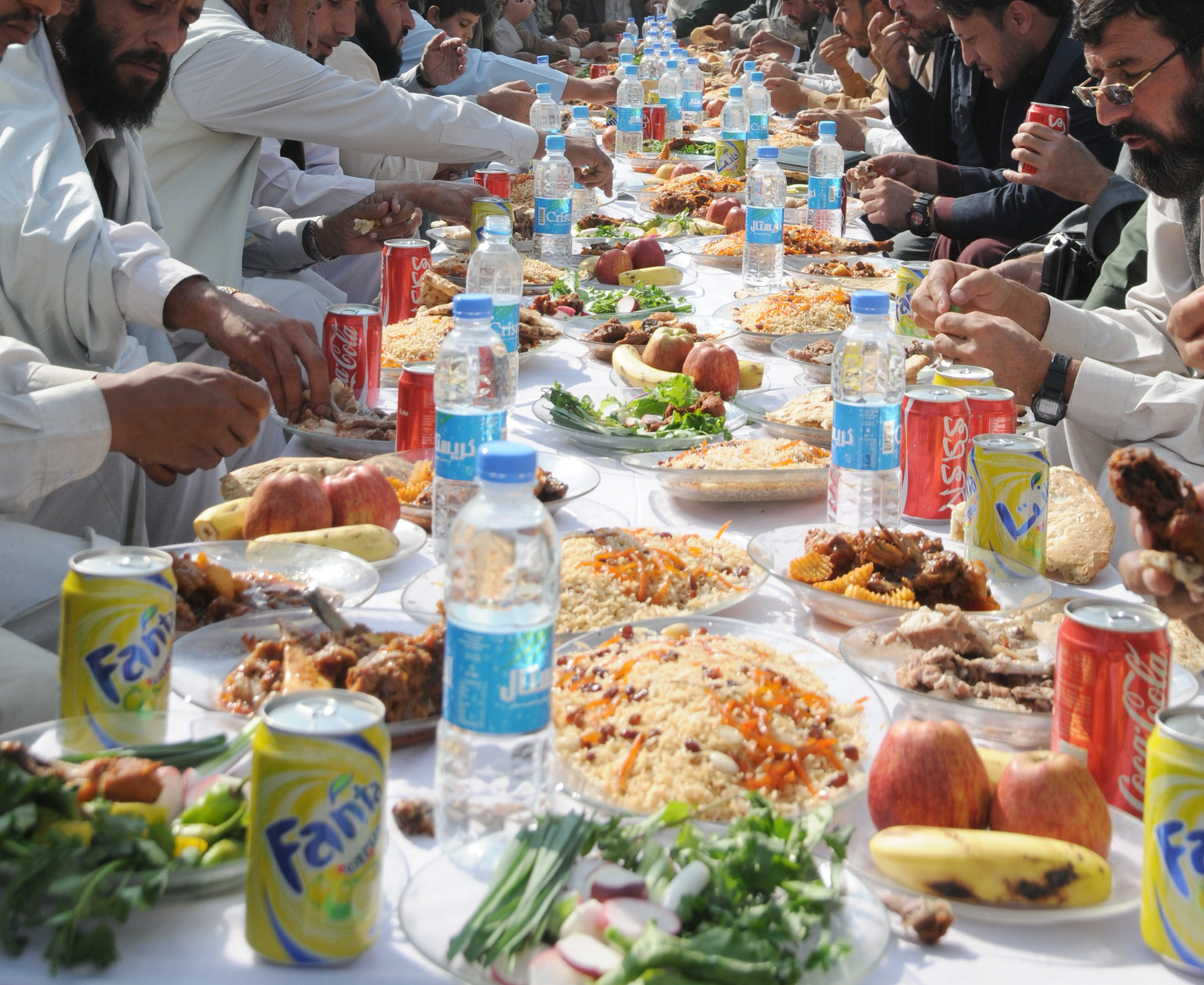
Afghan men eating at a lunchtime feast in Kunar Weleyat

- Afghan burger
- Afghan chatni made with fresh coriander leaves
- Afghan kofta (meatballs)
- Afghan salad
- Aush (hand-made noodles)
- Bamiya (cooked okra)
- Badenjan (cooked eggplant with potatoes and tomatoes)
- Badenjan-burani (fried slices of eggplant, topped with a garlic sour cream sauce and sprinkled with dried mint)
- Badenjan salad (eggplant salad with garlic)
- Bichak (small turnovers with various fillings, including potato and herbs, or ground meat)
- Bolani, also called "buregian" in southern Afghanistan (somewhat similar to a quesadilla)
- Chainaki or Dizi, also known as Abgosht in western Afghanistan
- Chakida or chakka (type of sour cream)
- Chopan (Pashto/Persian: چوپان, meaning "shepherd") kabob (Pashto/Persian: کباب) (skewered lamb chops grilled on charcoal)
- Dampukht (steamed rice)
- Delda or oagra (mainly a Southern dish, whose main ingredient is a mixture of split wheat and a variety of beans)
- Dolma (stuffed grape leaves)
- Gosh e feel (thin, fried pastries covered in powdered sugar and ground pistachios)
- Halwaua-e-aurd-e-sujee
- Kalah chuquki or kalah gunjeshk (battered deep-fried birds' heads)
- Kaleh pacha (lamb or beef head/feet cooked in a broth, served in bowls as a soup dish or in a stew or curry)
- Kebab (similar to Middle Eastern and Central Asian style)
- Khoujoor (Afghan pastry, deep-fried, oval-shaped, similar to doughnuts in taste)
- Kichri (sticky medium-grain rice cooked with mung beans and onions)
- Londi, or gusht-e-qaaq (spiced jerky)
- Maast or labanyat (type of plain yogurt)
- Mashawa (mixed beans and tiny meatballs, orange rind and herbs served in a bowl)
- Moraba (fruit preserves, sugar syrup and fruits, apple, sour cherry, or various berries, or made with dried fruits.)
- Nargis kabob (egg-based angel hair pasta soaked in sugar syrup, wrapped around a piece of meat)
- Narinj Palau (dried sweet orange peel and green raisins with a variety of nuts, mixed with saffron rice glazed with light sugar syrup)
- Osh pyozee (stuffed onion)
- Owmach (made from flour; a soup-like dish, but very thick and pasty)
- Salata (tomato and onion-based salad, often incorporating cucumber)
- Rosh (cooked lamb and mutton with no spices)
- Shami kabob (cooked beef blended with spices, flour, and eggs, and rolled into hot dog shapes or flat round shapes and fried)
- Sholeh Ghorbandi
- Shor-Nakhood (chickpeas with special toppings)
- Torshi (eggplant and carrot mixed with other herbs and spices, pickled in vinegar and aged)
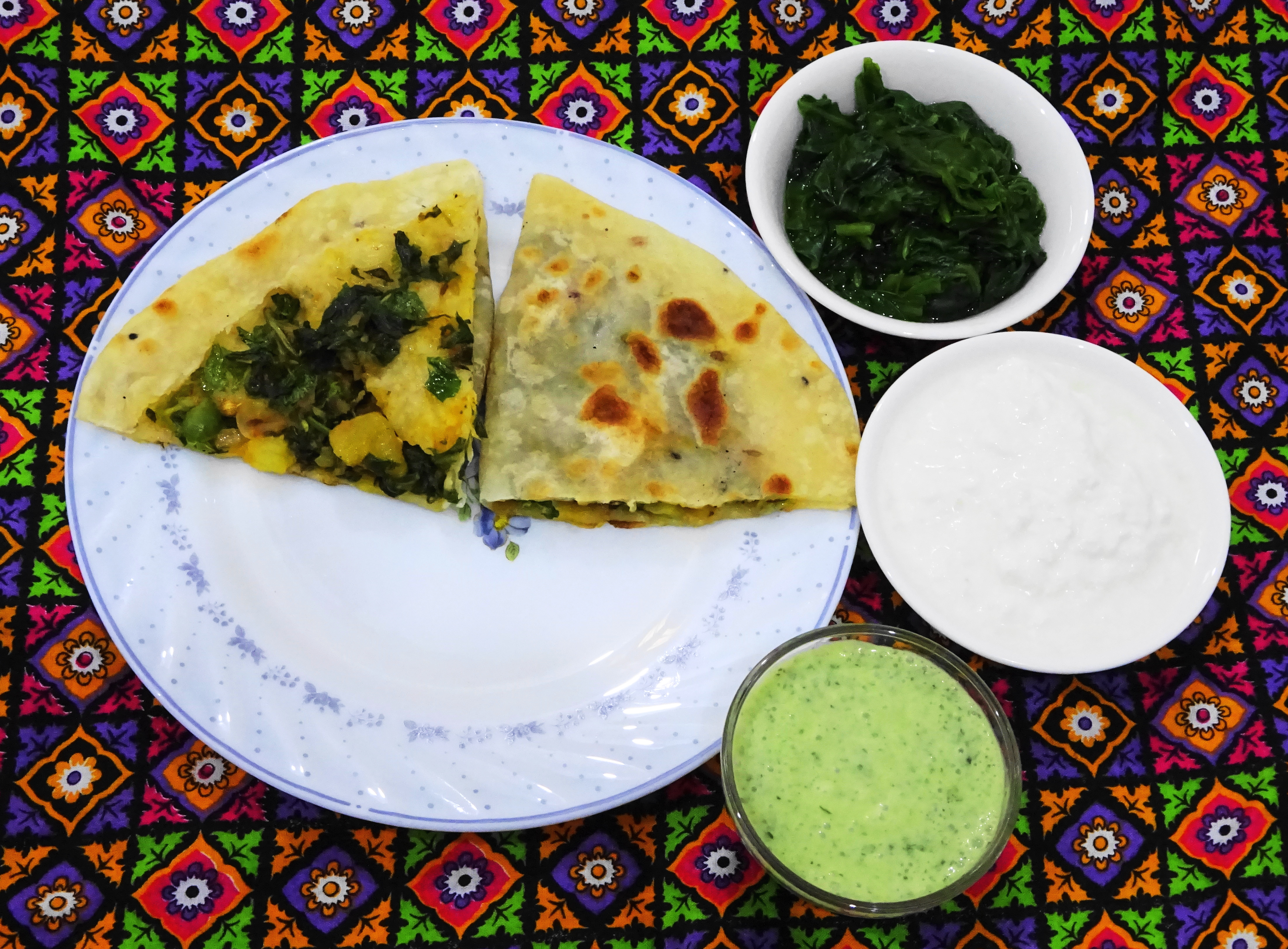
Bolani

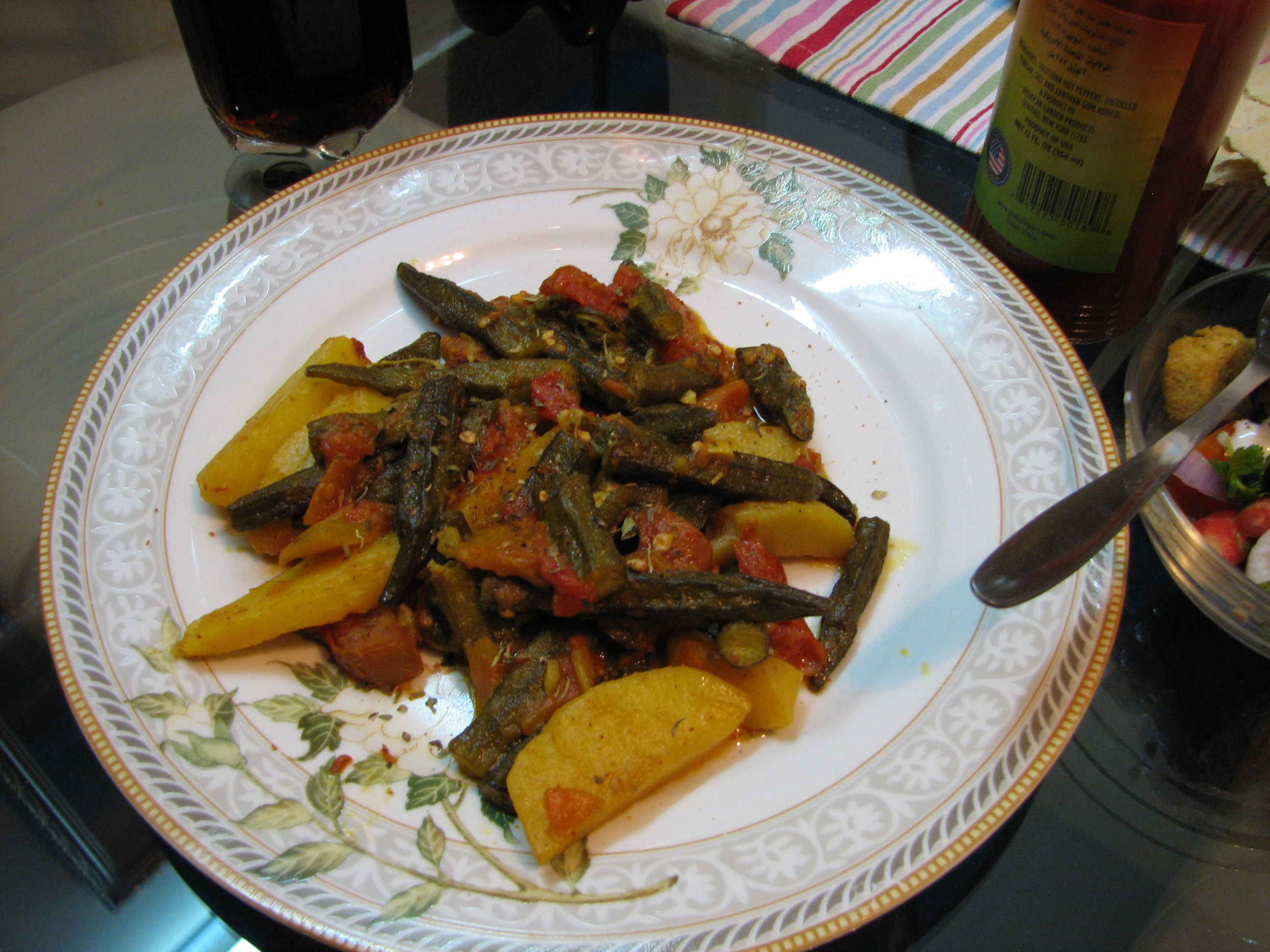
Cooked okra is also served for lunch or as a side dish

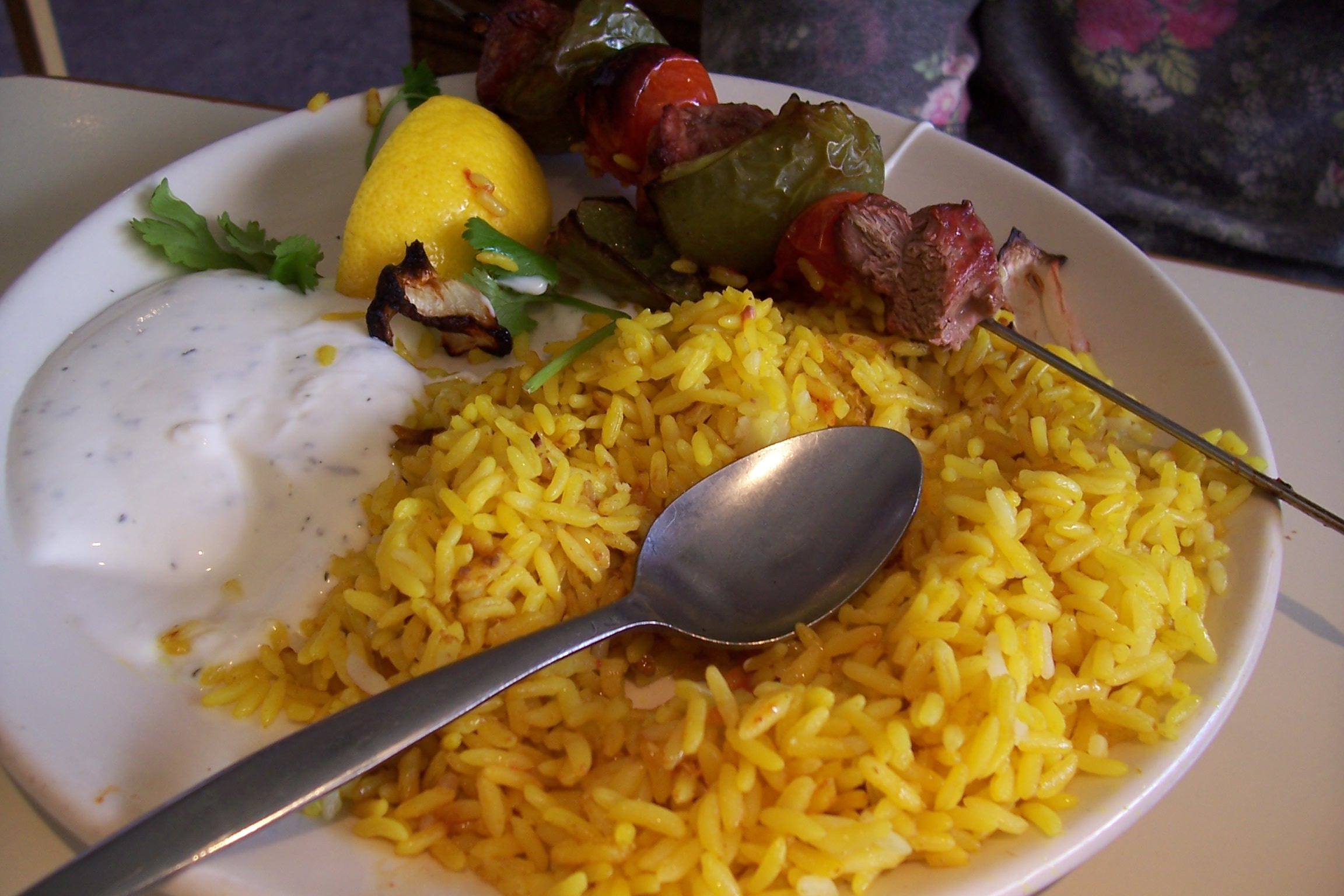
Afghan lamb kebab with yellow saffron rice

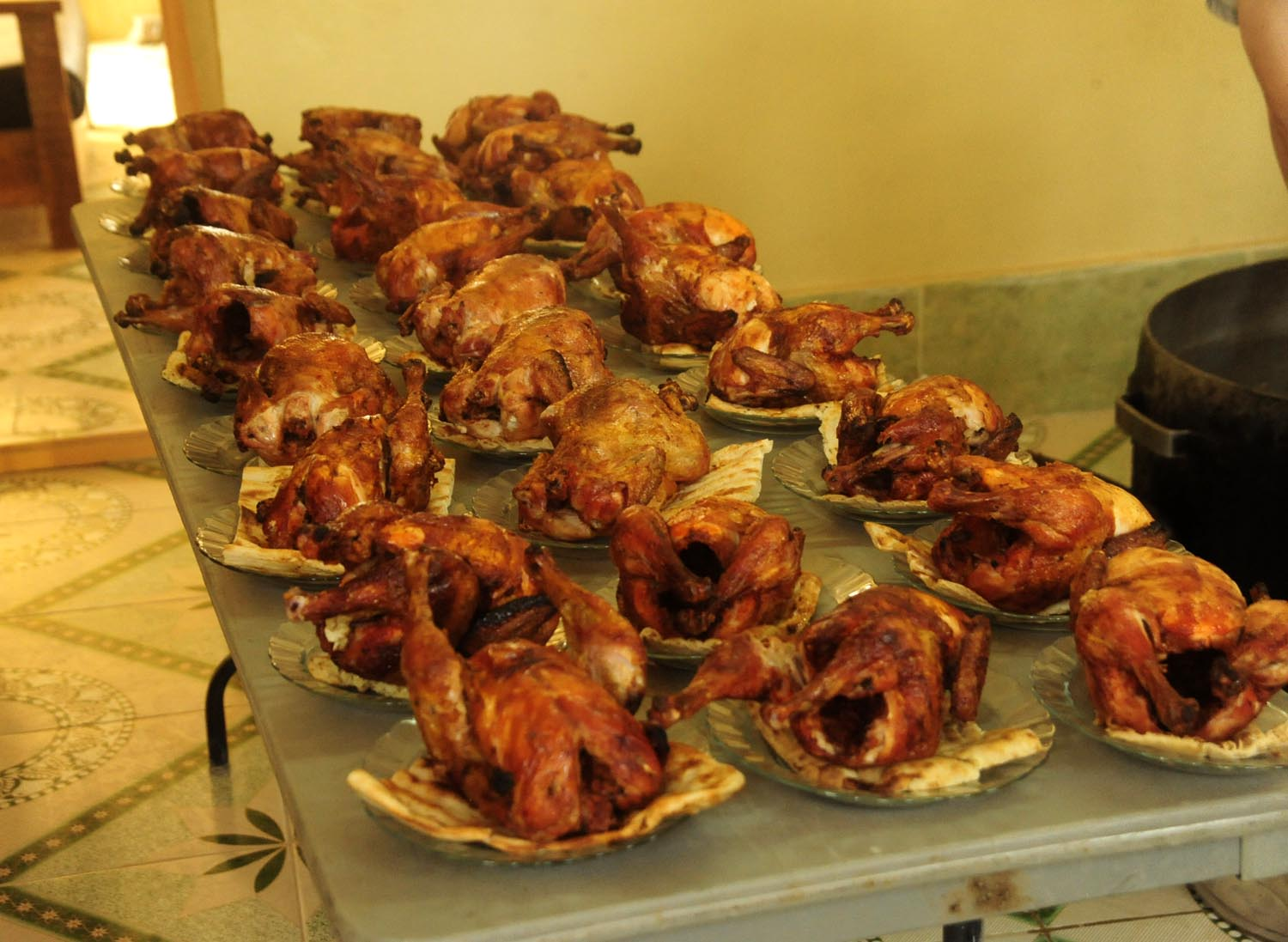
Roasted chicken

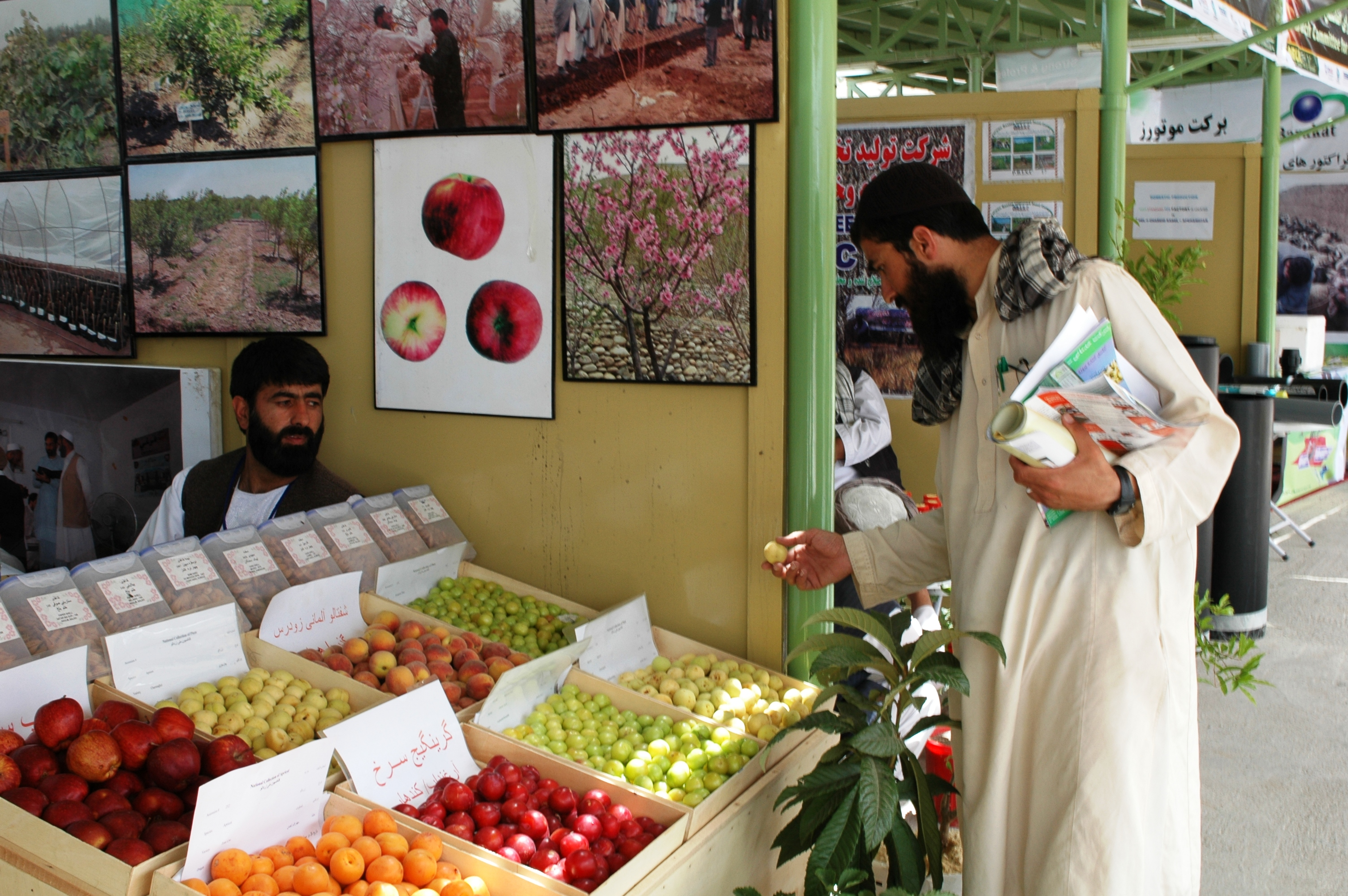
Samples of some native Afghan fruits

== Desserts and snacks ==
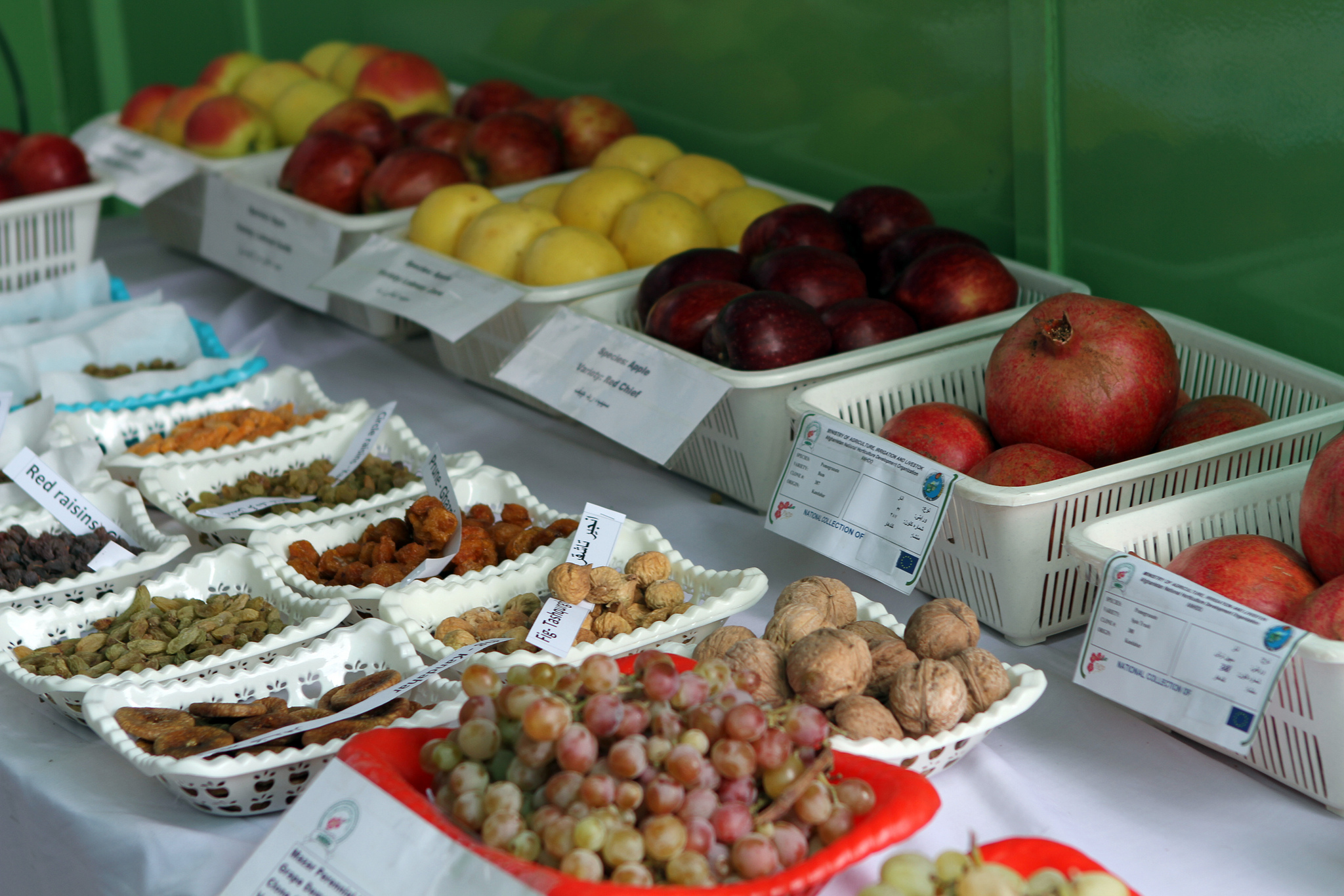
Samples of Afghan fresh and dried fruits

As a dessert after a meal, most Afghans generally eat fresh fruit. For snacks, they may drink tea with something sweet like cakes, cookies or pastries. On occasions, they also eat dried fruits which are widely available in every Afghan market. Other typical desserts include the following:

- Afghan cake (similar to pound cake, sometimes with real fruit or jelly inside)
- Baklava (pastry)
- Bastani
- Cream roll (pastry)
- Falooda or Faloodeh
- Firini
- Fernea, sometimes spelled feereny, (milk and cornstarch help make this very sweet, similar to rice pudding without the rice)
- Kolcha (variety of cookies, baked in clay ovens with charcoal)
- Shir- Yakh, a traditional wet ice cream
- Sheer khurma, a traditional dessert
- Sholeh Zard
- Shir Berenj (rice pudding)

== Soups ==
- Shorwa
- Shorwa-e-tarkari (meat and vegetable soup)
- Peyawa or eshkana (a soup based on flour, similar to a gravy, but mixed with chopped onion, potatoes, and eggs)
- Aush (noodle soup with herbs and beans)
- Aush-e serka (vinegar-based flat noodle soup)

== Drinks ==
=== Chai ===
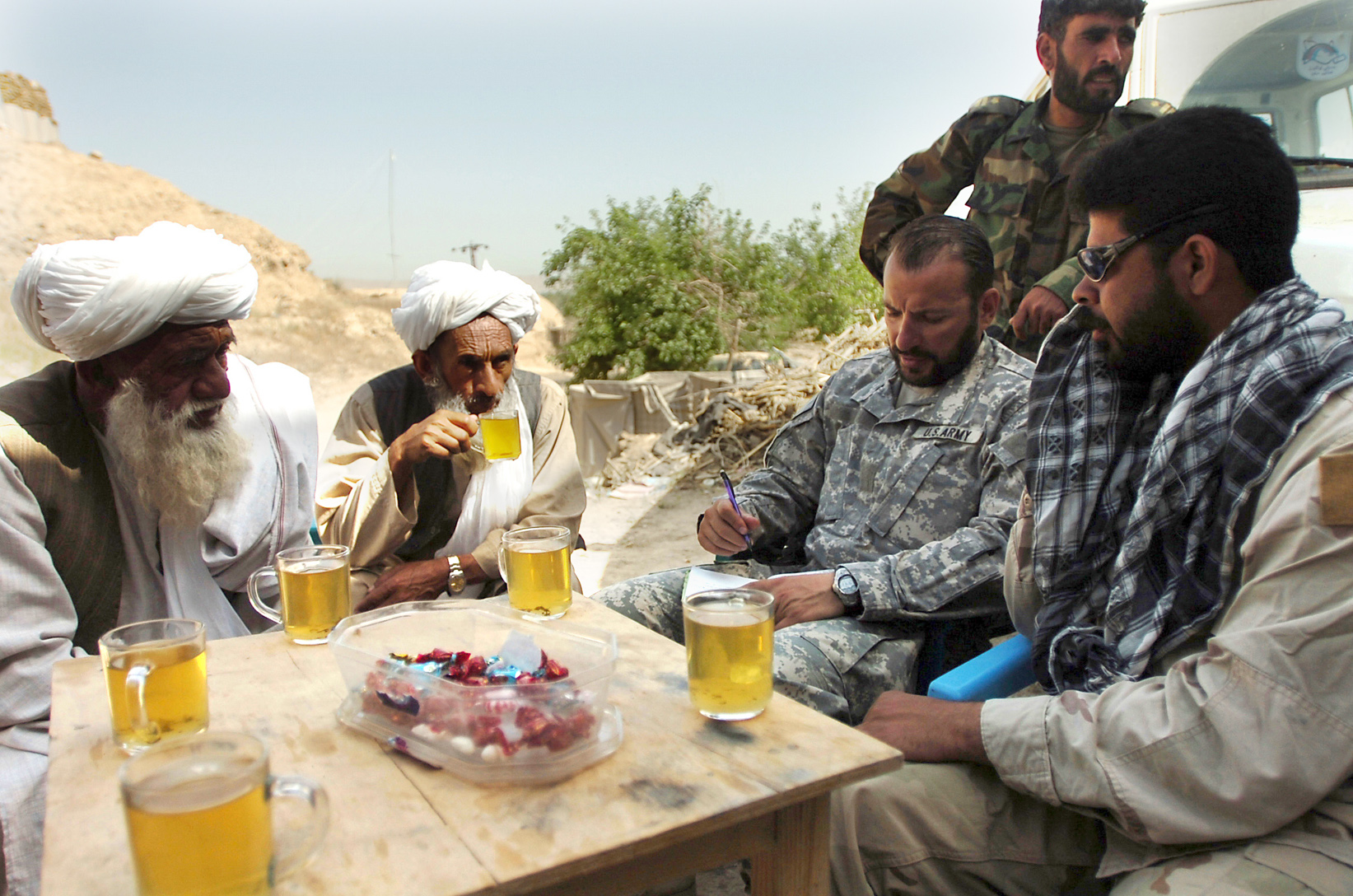
Village elders and US special forces drinking Afghan green tea in 2007

Chai is tea in Afghanistan, which can either be green or black. It is consumed at all times, especially a short time after finishing a meal or with guests during any social gathering. Most people drink green tea with no sugar. Some add cardamom, saffron, or sugar.

Sheer chai (or "milk tea") is also consumed but mostly in the morning and on special occasions. It is a type of Kashmiri chai. Many people of Afghanistan also drink masala chai, particularly in cities such as Asadabad, Jalalabad, Khost and Kandahar.

=== Doogh ===
Doogh (also known by some Afghans as shomleh or shlombeh) is a cold and savoury Persian drink. It is made with fermented milk and fresh or dried mint.. Unlike its sister beverage of Turkish origin, ayran, doogh is not diluted yogurt. Some variations of doogh include the addition of crushed or diced cucumber chunks. It is the second most widely consumed drink in Afghanistan (the first being tea), especially during lunchtime in summer. Doogh can be found at almost every Afghan grocery store and is served in restaurants.

== Sub-cuisines ==
While Afghans have a common cuisine, certain ethnicities form sub-variations of it.

=== Pashtun cuisine ===
Pashtuns are the largest ethnic group of Afghanistan, constituting about 42% of the country's total population. A major dish in Pashtun culture are rosh (cooked lamb and mutton with no spices) and sohbat, found at traditional gatherings and events. Other major Pashtun dishes include lamb-skewered sajji and chapli kebab. The name dampukht stands for steamed meat, and khaddi kebab is the Afghan shashlik, which is grilled on an open fire, on a spit.

Although it differs between regions, Pashtun cuisine is meat-heavy and often includes caramelized rice. For example, the dish known as bolani in the north and east is often called borogyen in the south and west of Afghanistan.

Common summer beverages include shlombeh, a drink consisting of liquid yogurt, mint, and cucumber. Sherbet is an ice-sugared cold drink. Sher yakh is a sweet ice-like product.

=== Hazara cuisine ===
The Hazara people in central Afghanistan (in the region of Hazarajat) and western Pakistan (Balochistan province) have their own fare. The Hazaragi cuisine shares some similarities with neighboring regional cuisines, so it is mainly influenced by Central Asian, Persian, and South Asian cooking. However, cooking methods vary in some of the dishes of these neighboring cuisines.

== Dining etiquette ==
Traditionally, dinners are served on a tablecloth on the floor, which is called the dastarkhan. Meals are normally eaten with the right hand. After a meal, tea with dessert is served.

== Special occasions ==
Serving tea and white sugared almonds (called nuql) is customary during Afghan festivals.

== See also ==
- Culture of Afghanistan
- Economy of Afghanistan
