= Renée Florence Vilain =

Belgian Businessperson (1816-1889)

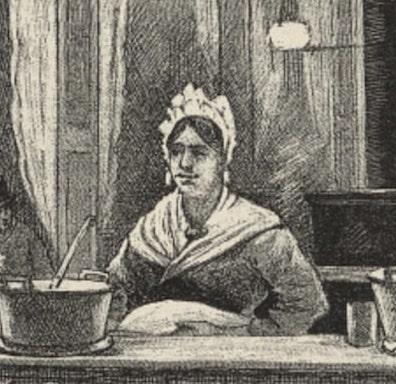

Renée Florence Vilain (1816-1889), was a Belgian businessperson.

She is known for having co-founded the first Friterie in Belgium in 1844.
