= French tacos =

French fast food dish

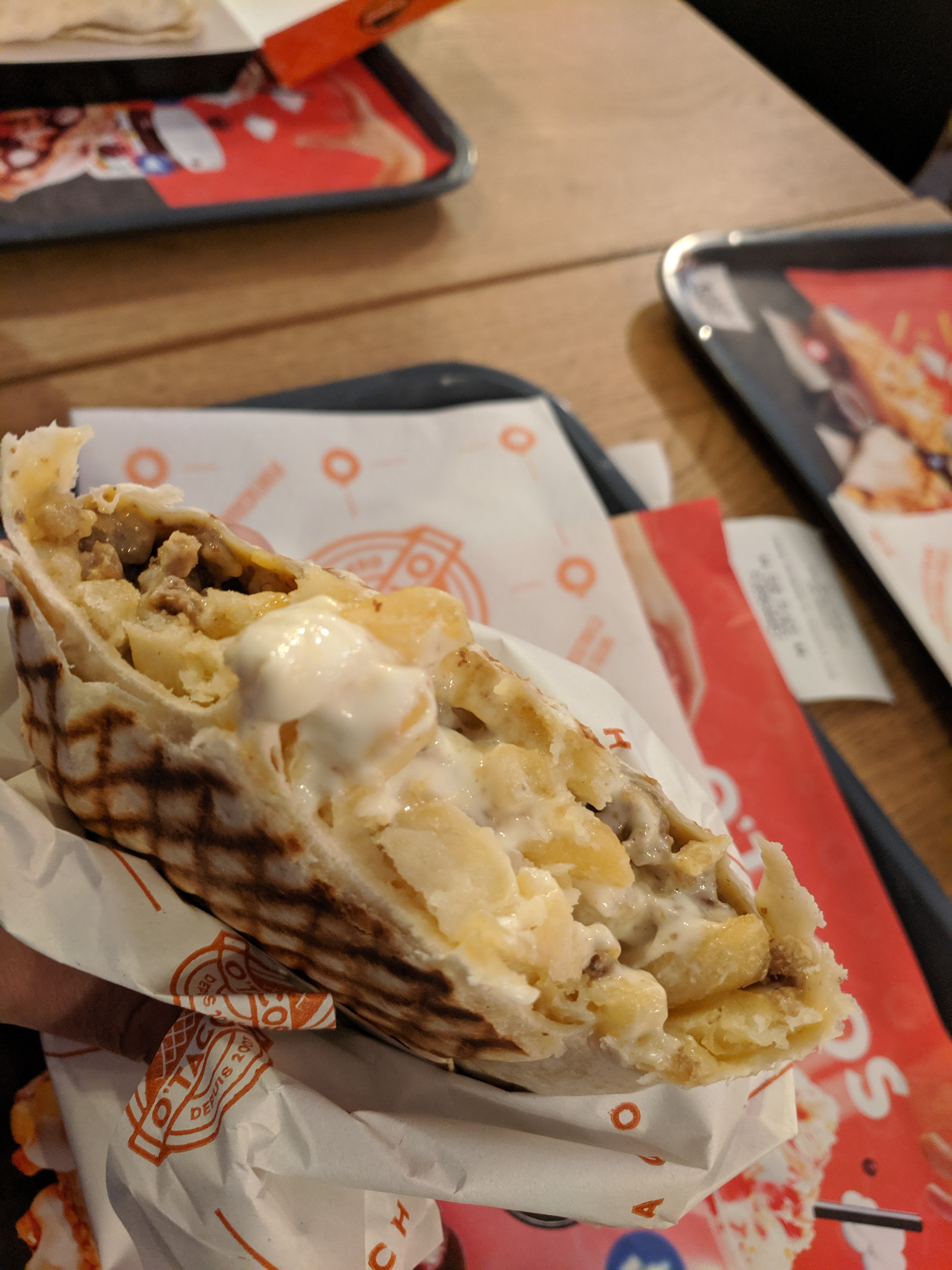
- French tacos from O'Tacos
- Type: Finger food, fast food, street food
- Course: Main course
- Place of origin: France
- Region or state: Rhône-Alpes
- Serving temperature: Warm
- Main ingredients: Tortilla, meat, fries, sauce

A French tacos (Note: Contrary to Spanish, French, and English conventions, the final S is generally present even in the singular form.) (US: /ˈtɑːkoʊs/, UK: /ˈtækoʊs/; French: tacos français, [takos fʁɑ̃sɛ], or commonly tacos (Note: The English phrase French tacos may also be used, even in France.)), Lyonese tacos (French: tacos lyonnais) or matelas (French for "mattress"), is a fast food dish which usually consists of a flour tortilla grilled and folded around a filling of French fries, cheese, and meat, among other deli ingredients.

== Description ==
Despite the name, French tacos has little to do with the taco and is more similar to a burrito or quesadilla. French tacos has also been compared to the panini and the shawarma sandwich, and is similar to the California burrito.

The tacos consists of a flour tortilla wrapped or folded in a rectangular shape around a filling which usually includes:

- some type of meat, such as chicken, turkey or beef, in the form of mince, escalopes, chicken nuggets, shawarma, cordon bleu, or turkey lardons;
- Belgian fries;
- cheese, which may be Emmental, some other type of French cheese, Cheddar, or processed cheese (like The Laughing Cow's Toastinette or meltable American cheese), or a cheese sauce;
- an additional sauce or relish, which is generally any of white döner kebab sauce, Algérienne sauce, ketchup, mayonnaise, harissa, barbecue sauce, or other sauces usually available in kebab shops;
- vegetables, generally in the form of salad mix, but also in other forms such as shakshouka.

It is then served warm by grilling (with the use of a panini grill) or toasting.

Many different recipes exist and it is common for French tacos restaurants to deliver made-to-order products by letting customers choose à la carte from the aforementioned ingredients. Meat-free variants also exist.

Most French tacos made in France are marketed as halal-certified and as such do not contain pork, in order to accommodate Muslim customers.

A newsletter of Vaulx-en-Velin described it as "In short, a rather successful marriage between panini, kebab, and burrito".

== History ==
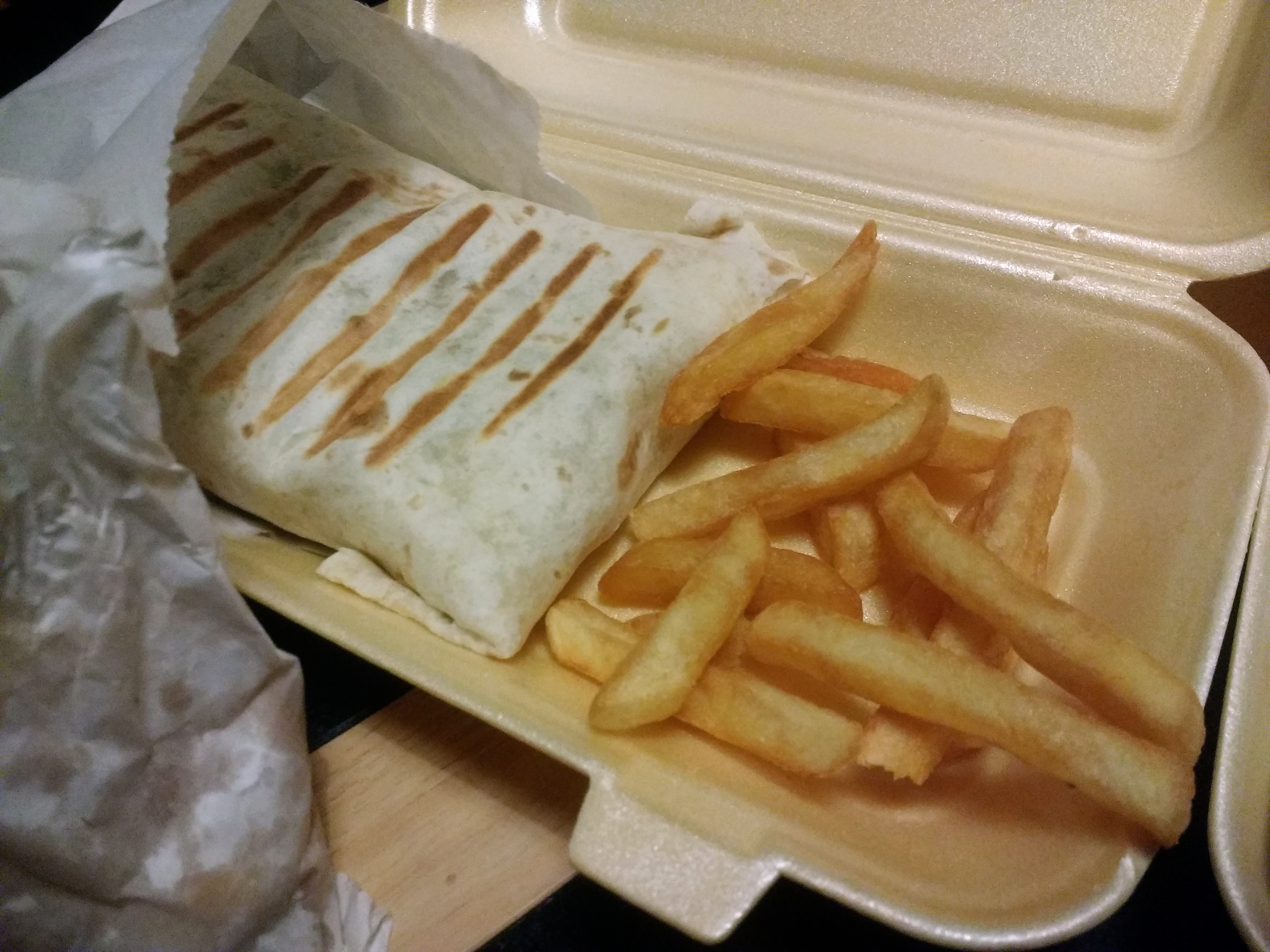
French tacos from London

There are conflicting accounts about the exact origin of French tacos. Some accounts say it was invented in the mid-2000s by Moroccan born brothers Abdelhadi and Mohammed Moubarek as they were running a kebab shop in Savoy. French documentary series 66 minutes, on the other hand, credits Mohamed Soualhi, founder of the chain Tacos Avenue (formerly Tacos King) with inventing the sandwich in Lyon in the late 2000s. However, Soualhi himself, as well as other sources, have affirmed that "French tacos" were first sighted in fast food restaurants in the city of Vaulx-en-Velin near Lyon in the early 2000s.

By the late 2000s, French tacos had become popular among teenagers and young adults in Rhône-Alpes. Years later, their popularity spread to the rest of France as dedicated chains ran massive ad campaigns, with the help of social media and celebrity endorsements.

In 2013, the Moubarek brothers launched "Tacos de Lyon," the first French tacos restaurant, in Casablanca, Morocco. The sandwich quickly gained popularity among young adults in Morocco's major cities and was hailed by TelQuel in 2017 as "the new star of fast food in Morocco." By then, 50 restaurants, including 35 Tacos de Lyon locations, were serving the dish nationwide. French tacos establishments have also expanded to other countries, including Algeria, Senegal, Canada, Switzerland,, Vietnam. and Australia. As of August 2023, the French chain O’Tacos operates 260 locations in France and has expanded to the Netherlands, Germany, Italy, Belgium, Ireland and Spain.

Some have also speculated that the idea was borrowed from the Greeks, considering it is a common and long held practice to put fries in Greek Gyros sandwiches.

=== Name origin ===
The origin of the name "French tacos" is subject to as much speculation as the sandwich itself. Daniel Shkolnik of Vice describes the naming as tacos as "a kind of marketing bait-and-switch, drawing people with the promise of a Mexican culinary icon and then selling them something completely different." As its popularity grew, the sandwich was gradually branded as tacos français to tell it apart from the original taco. In turn, the taco is sometimes referred to in France as "Mexican taco" (French: taco mexicain) to emphasize the difference between the two dishes.

== See also ==
- Afghani burger
- Döner kebab
- Dürüm
- Chip butty
- Fusion cuisine
- Halal snack pack
- Kapsalon
- Korean taco
- Mitraillette — a Belgian fast-food item typically containing similar ingredients but placed in a baguette
- Panini
- Philly taco
- Poutine
- Taco rice — a fusion dish from Okinawa, Japan
