= Sauce andalouse =

Belgian sauce

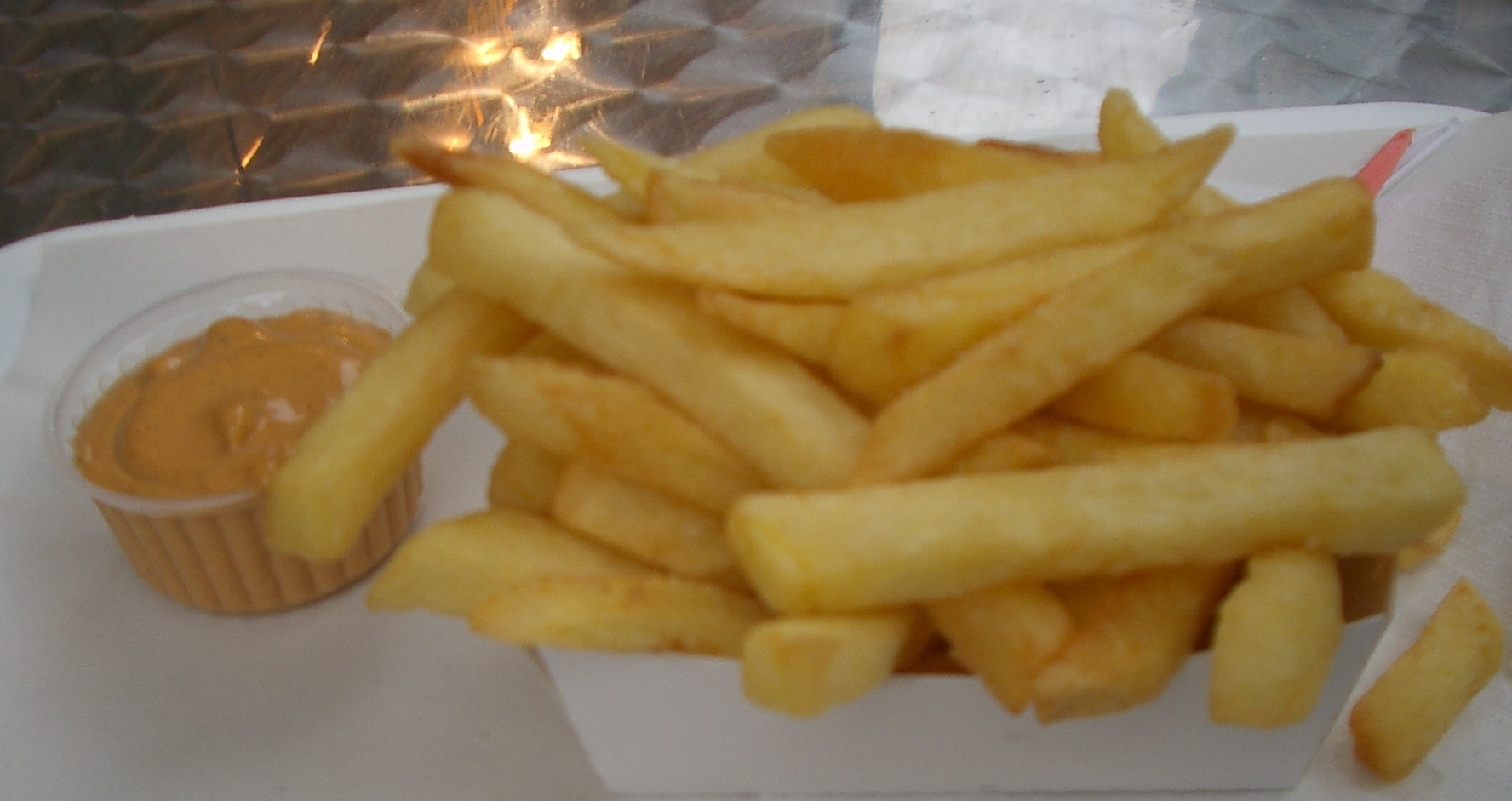
Belgian frites with sauce andalouse

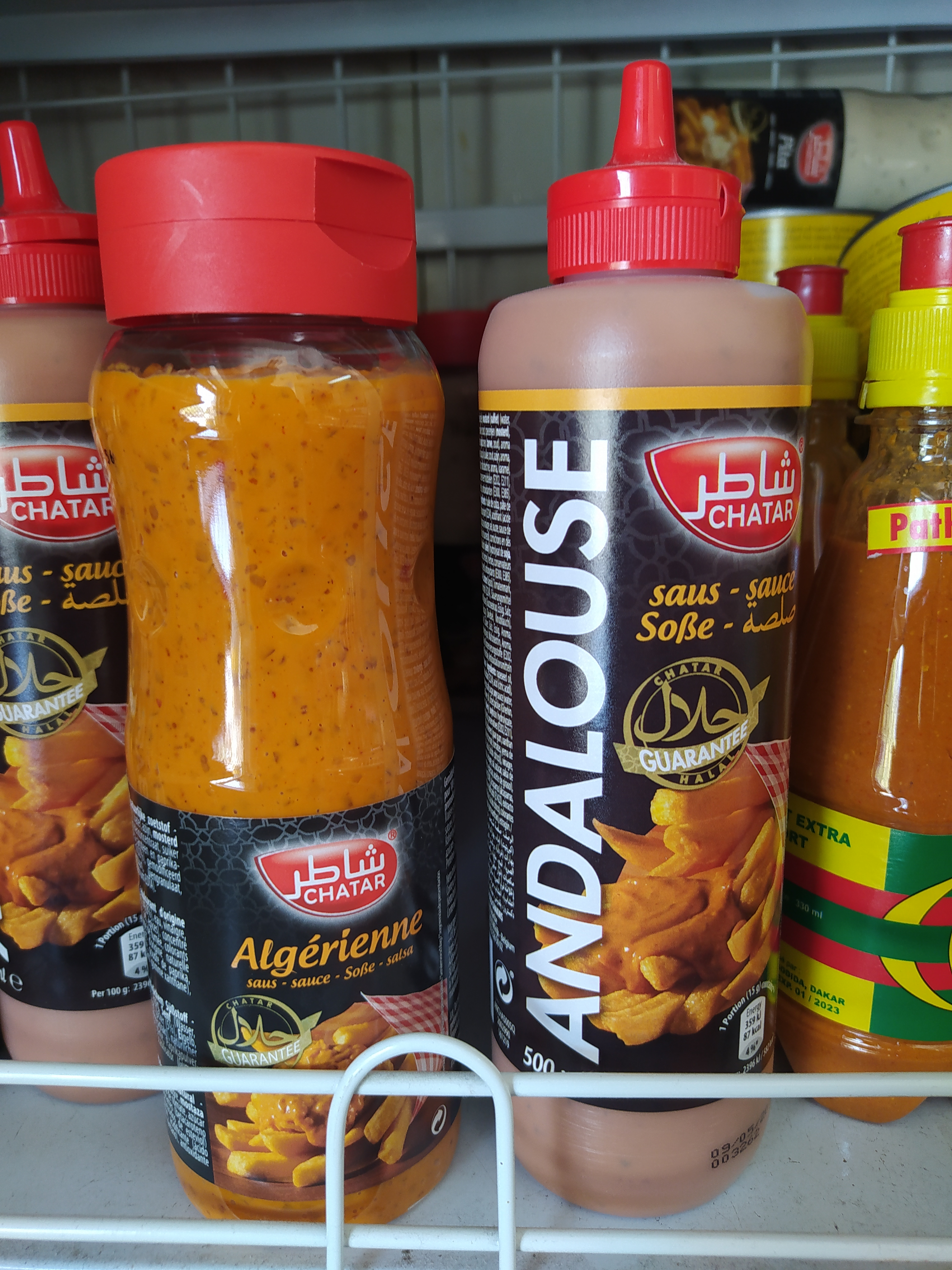
Andalouse on a store shelf

Sauce andalouse is a Belgian condiment commonly served with Belgian fries. The sauce is also popular and widely used throughout France and Luxembourg. It consists of mayonnaise, tomato paste, and peppers, such as pimientos or roasted bell peppers. Some recipes use velouté or espagnole sauce instead of mayonnaise.

== See also ==
- Algérienne sauce
- Fry sauce
- List of sauces
