= Aushak =

Afghan dish made of pasta dumplings

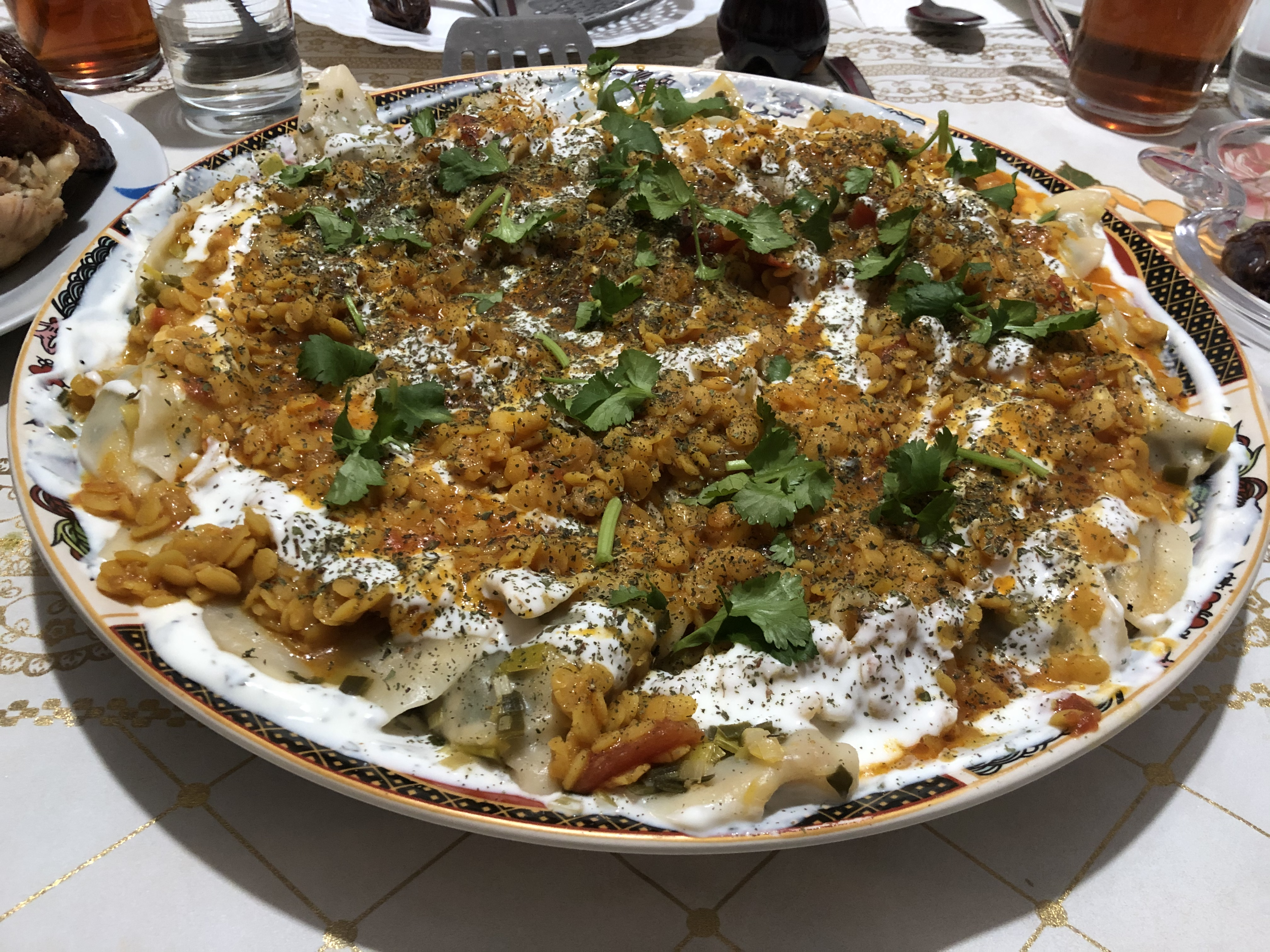
- Aushak dumplings
- Alternative names: Ashak
- Place of origin: Afghanistan
- Main ingredients: Pasta, chives, tomato sauce, yogurt, mint

Aushak or ashak (Pashto/Persian: آشک) is an Afghan dish made of pasta dumplings filled with chives, with a (frequently meaty) tomato sauce, topped with yogurt and dried mint. A time-consuming meal to prepare, it is usually served on holidays or at special gatherings. It is similar to mantu, which is also popular in Afghanistan. In contrast to aushak, mantu have a meat filling.
