= Afghani burger =

Afghan food

- Type: Wrap
- Course: Street food, Snack
- Place of origin: Afghanistan
- Region or state: Pakistan
- Associated cuisine: Pakistani, Afghan
- Serving temperature: Hot
- Main ingredients: Afghan bread, french fries, cabbage and other vegetables, Afghan chutneys and other assorted condiments
- Variations: With sausages or other meat additions

An Afghani burger (also known as the Kabuli burger) is an Afghan fast food wrap consisting of a piece of Afghan bread rolled around french fries, along with chutney and other condiments, vegetables, and often sausages or other meat. It borrows influences from Afghan cuisine and was popularized inside Pakistan by Afghan immigrants (especially in Islamabad, where it is considered one of the staple street foods of the city, and Peshawar).

== See also ==
- French tacos
- Gyro (food)
- Shawarma
- Wrap (food)
