= Friterie =

Food booth that sells fries and other fried fast food originating in Belgium

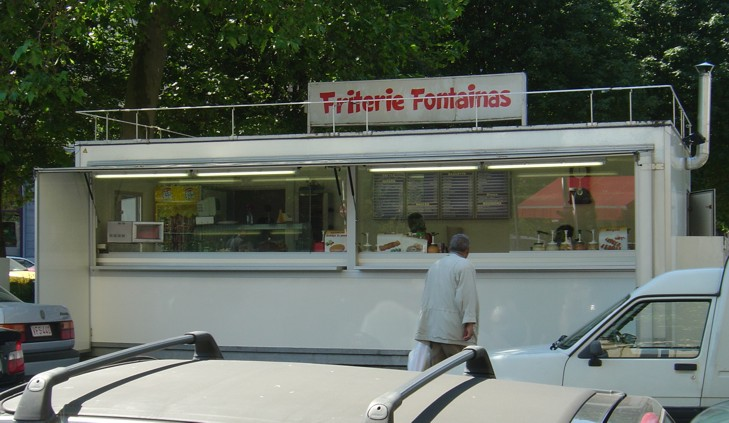
A typical friterie in Brussels

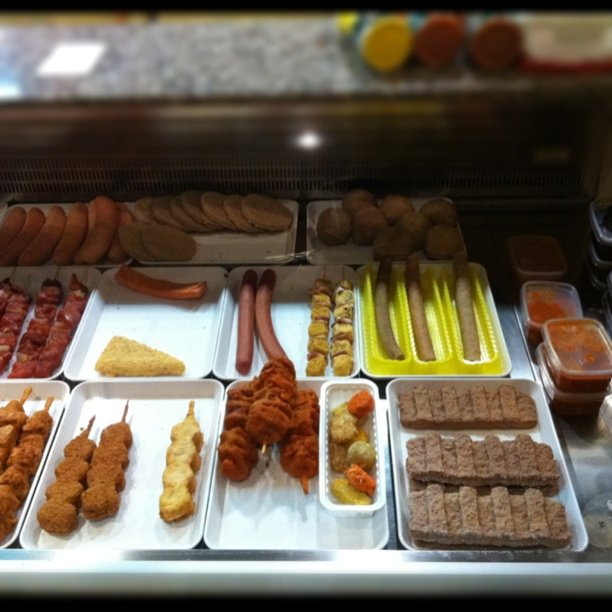
A typical assortment of meats offered at a Belgian friterie.

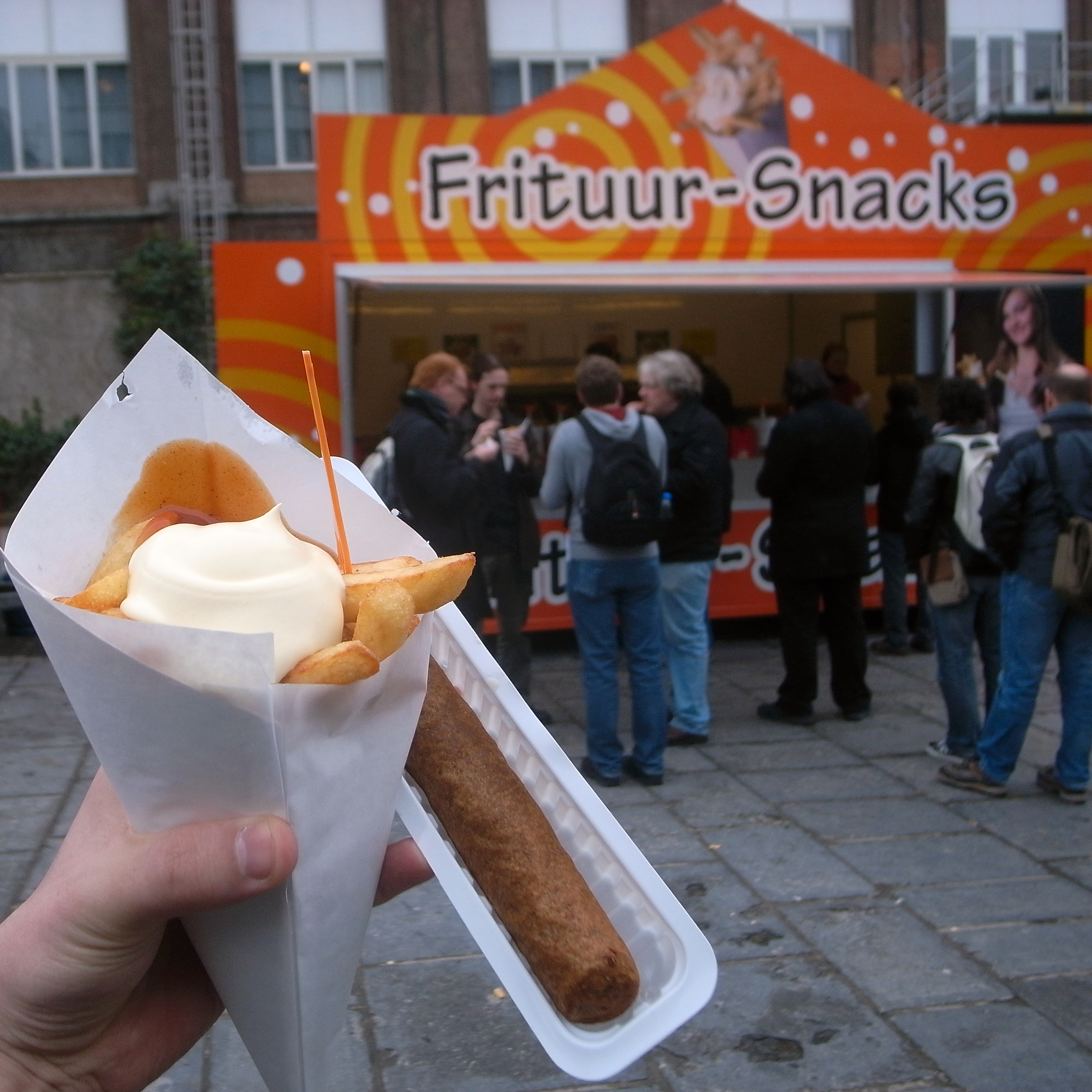
French fries wrapped in a traditional cone, served with mayonnaise and curry ketchup, with a small plastic fork on top and a frikandel on the side

Sound of a Friterie in Brussels

A friture, baraque à frites or friterie (pronounced [fʁitʁi]) in French-speaking Belgium and Northern France, or frituur or frietkot in Flanders and the Netherlands, also fritkot in French-speaking Belgium and friture or frietkraam in the Netherlands, is a traditional restaurant, kiosk or van serving quick-service fast food, particularly fries from which they derive their name.

Friteries are often found on main highways and town squares and may be in the form of restaurants offering table service or a caravan, trailer or even converted van only offering take away food at roadsides.

Friteries offer several fried and grilled dishes served with frites, such as hamburgers, brochette, meatballs, merguez and fried chicken. These dishes have regionally varying nicknames to distinguish the different combinations of ingredients, like the "bearclaw", for example. Traditionally, the most typical companion to fries were cold mussels in vinegar, as well as carbonade flamande. Another characteristic of a Belgian friterie is the large selection of Belgian sauces including ketchup, curry ketchup, mayonnaise, aïoli, tartar sauce, cocktail Whisky sauce, American, Samuraï, Andalouse, Riche, Mexican, Orientale, Brazil, Béarnaise or Diablo.

Originally, the frites were served in sheets of paper rolled into an upside down cone. Nowadays most friteries also serve them in a plastic or cardboard tray, with a small plastic fork. An order usually concludes with the question whether the fries need to be salted, and whether the order is to go, in which case it will be wrapped in sheets of paper that are punctured to let the hot air escape instead of condensing on the cold paper.

A variation is to serve meat, fries, sauce and possibly salad in a half of a baguette and is known as a Mitraillette. Alternatively, the same ensemble can be put into a Dürüm, although this practice is more common in friteries run by Turkish immigrants.

The oldest known friterie was located in Antwerp (Belgium) in 1842.

The friterie is the subject matter of the 2010 documentary "Fritkot" directed by Manuel Poutte.

== In popular culture ==
In Marc Sleen's comics series The Adventures of Nero the character Jan Spier owns a friterie, where usually caricatures of famous people order fries.

== See also ==
- Fish and chip shop
- Cuisine of Belgium
- Cuisine of France
- Cuisine of the Netherlands
