= Philly taco =

Sandwich made of a cheesesteak wrapped in a jumbo slice

- Course: Main course
- Place of origin: United States
- Created by: Jeff Barg and Adam Gordon
- Serving temperature: Hot
- Main ingredients: Cheesesteak, jumbo slice

A Philly taco, also known as the Lorenzo's–Jim's Challenge, is a sandwich consisting of a cheesesteak wrapped in a jumbo slice.

== History ==
The Philly taco was created by Jeff Barg and Adam Gordon in 2003. The Philly taco was intended as a challenge on South Street, the location of the stores where challengers needed to buy the pizza slice, and then buy the cheesesteak a block away, and then assemble the dish. The dish was then created by wrapping the Lorenzo's pizza slice around a Jim's South Street cheesesteak.

In 2003, Barg wrote about the dish in the Philadelphia Weekly as "the Lorenzo's–Jim's Challenge" in the "Top 5 of the moment". On The Pizza Show featured episode, Barg acknowledged that he did not mention that it was: "...something that my friend and I made up, I wrote about it as though it were 'a thing' that people do. And then it became a thing that people do, and now it's become this great Philly institution."

As a "combination" dish, it has been described by the Philly Insiders' Michael Klein as "...a turducken for drunks and stoners."

== Recommended flavors ==
Barg described the original concept to Klein as a take-away cheesesteak, which could be a cheesesteak hoagie, including lettuce and tomatoes to refer to the taco flavor. The pizza slice for wrapping should be plain, without toppings. The dish may be assembled with the pizza slice either rolled like a taco, or lengthwise.

On The Pizza Show featured episode, Barg described the sensation as "...the Whiz [of the cheesesteak] and the mozzarella [of the pizza] interplay really nicely..." in the dish.

In his original 2003 introductory article, Barg recommended an accompanying beverage such as Dr. Brown's black cherry soda.

== Coverage ==
Carolyn Wyman included the Philly taco in her publication, The Great Philly Cheesesteak Book, in 2009 (in a feature on Jim's Steaks, in the Hometown eateries chapter). Wyman noted the alternate name of the Jim's/Lorenzo Challenge, and that if the lines at Jim's Steaks were too long, that an acceptable substitute cheesesteak could be sourced from Ishkabibble's or Steaks on South.

The dish was featured for NPR blog's "Sandwich Mondays" by Ian Chillag in November 2010.

The Philly taco was included as one of "15 of America's most outrageous foods" in August 2014.

A veganised version of the Philly taco was created by Blackbird Pizzeria as part of an eating challenge for Philadelphia's celebration of World Vegan Day in 2014.

It was highlighted on an episode of The Pizza Show in season two, where host Frank Pinello ate a Philly taco with Jeff Barg. It has been variously credited as episode 5 or episode 10, circa 2017.

== See also ==
- Steak sandwich
- List of American sandwiches
