= Gosh-e fil =

Afghan sweet fried pastry

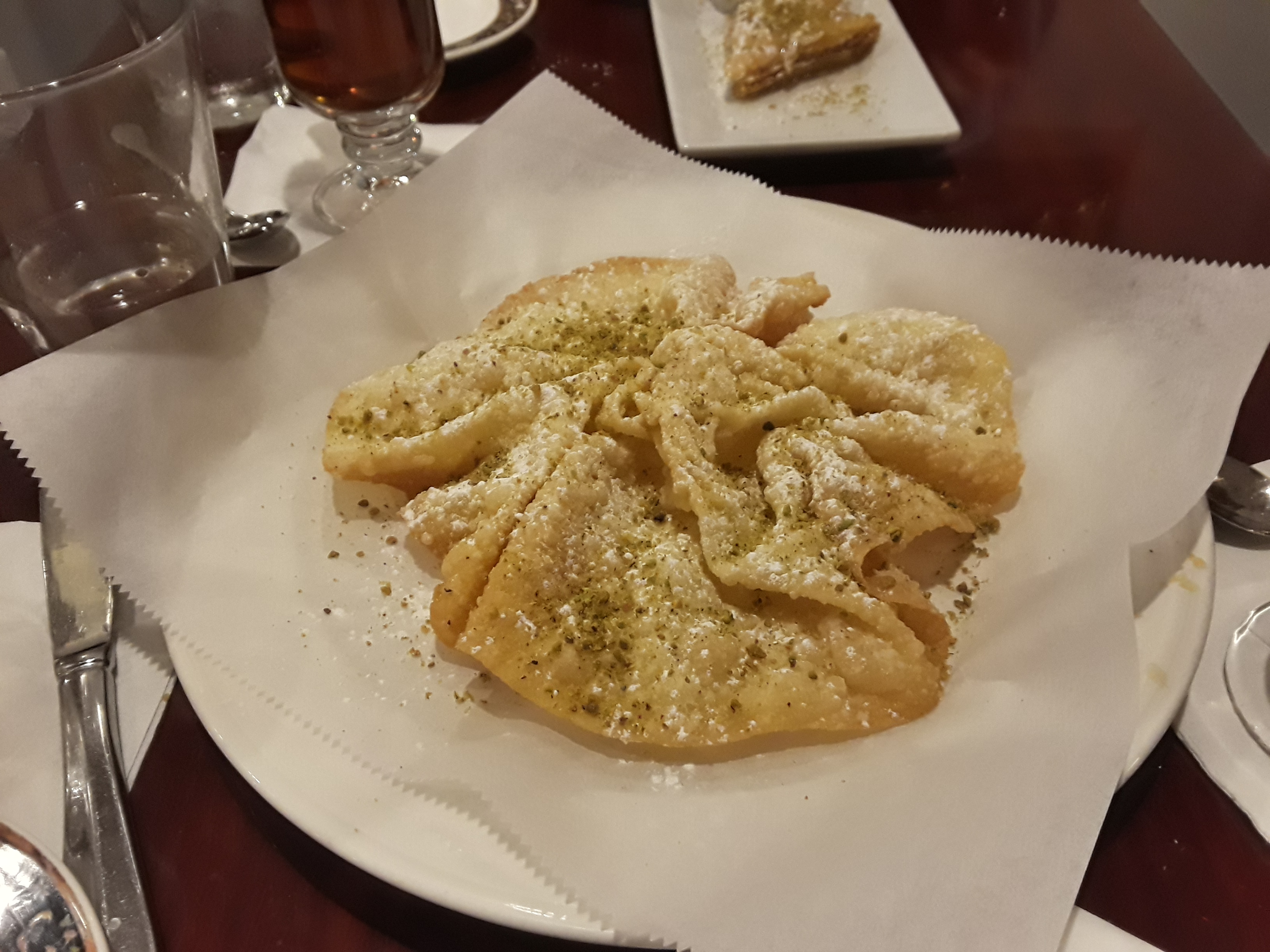
- Alternative names: Gosh feel, gosh-e feel, gowsh-e fil, gush-e fil
- Type: Fried dough
- Course: Dessert
- Place of origin: Afghanistan
- Main ingredients: Dough (flour, milk, butter, sugar, salt, cardamom, eggs), pistachios, powdered sugar

Gosh-e fil (Persian: گُوش فيل, lit. '"elephant's ear"') is a fried pastry from Afghanistan. The dough is shaped like an elephant ear (goosh), and deep-fried in oil. Each piece is then topped with chopped pistachios and powdered sugar.

This sweet is mainly served with tea, especially during Nowruz and other festivals.

The dough is made by whisking eggs, milk and butter, then adding the mixture to the dry ingredients.

== Gosh-e fil ==
Afghanistan is known for its delicious and historic cuisine. Pastries and sweets have long been rooted in the food culture of the local people that continues to this day.

== See also ==
- List of doughnut varieties
- List of fried dough varieties
- List of desserts
