= Samurai sauce =

Franco-Belgian condiment

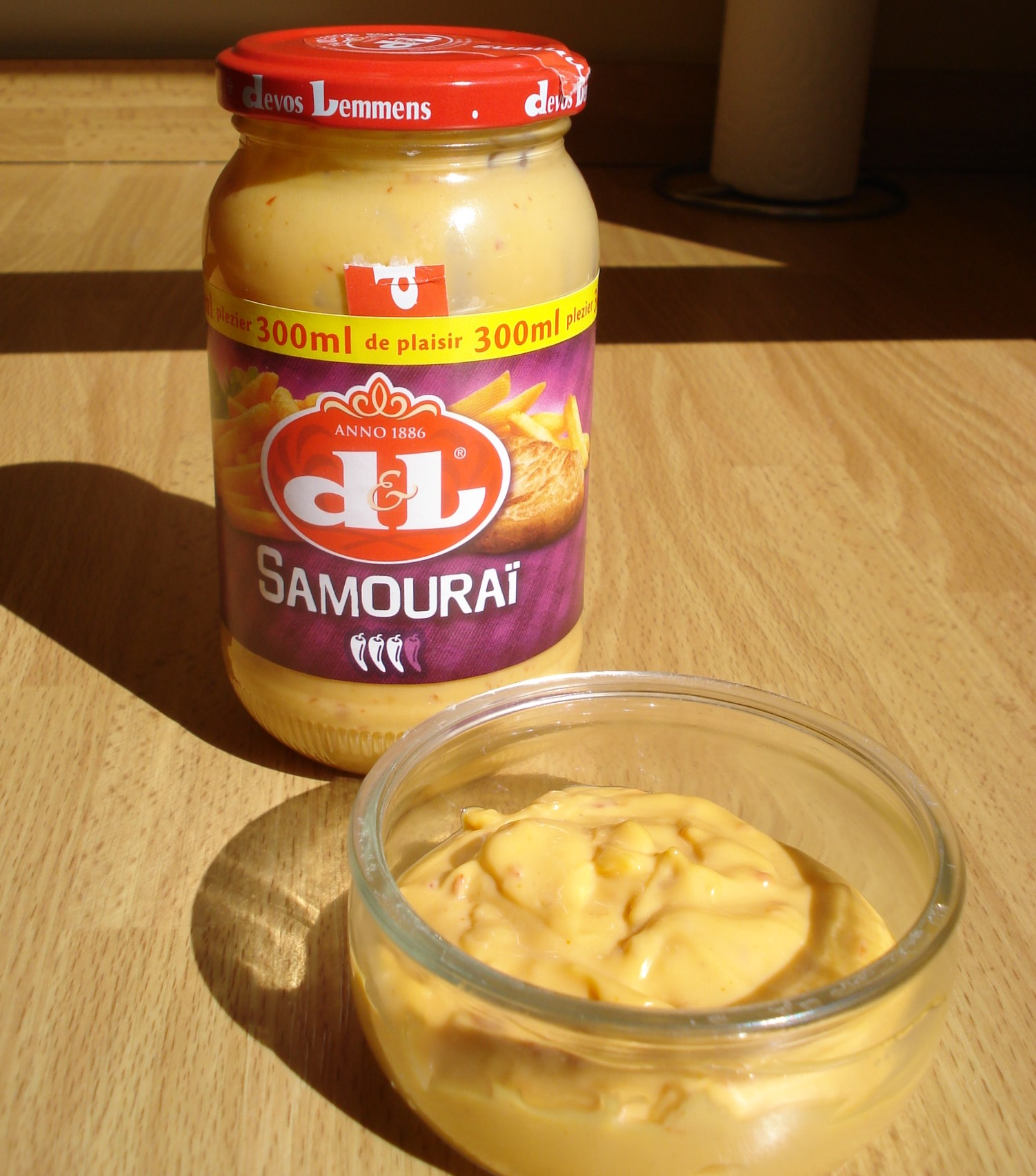
Samurai sauce

Samurai sauce (French: Sauce samouraï) is a Belgian condiment prepared from mayonnaise, ketchup, and harissa or sambal oelek and commonly served with French fries. The sauce is also popular and widely used throughout France. Algerian sauce, a variant of Samurai sauce with onions added, is not to be confused with the also popular sauce of the same name.

Mobile friteries in Belgium often have samurai sauce, with some making it their special item. In addition, many kebab restaurants have Samurai sauce as an available condiment.
