= O'Tacos =

French fast food chain

- Industry: Fast food
- Founded: 2010
- Founder: Patrick Pelonero; Silman Traoré; Samba Traoré; Sauroutou Diarra
- Headquarters: Montrouge, France
- Number of locations: 326 (2023)
- Area served: Worldwide
- Products: French tacos; chicken; french fries; soft drinks; desserts
- Number of employees: 50 to 99 employees in offices 1000+ employees in restaurants
- Website: o-tacos.com/en/

O'Tacos (French pronunciation: [o takos]) is a French fast food chain founded in 2010. Headquartered in Montrouge near Paris, O'Tacos has restaurants across France and has expanded internationally: it is found in Belgium, Brunei, Germany, Denmark, Italy, the Netherlands, Luxembourg, Spain, Portugal, Algeria, Morocco, the United States, and Canada. The chain specializes in "French tacos", a fast food dish that consists of a flour tortilla wrap with French fries, meat and cheese.

== History ==
In 2007, Patrick Pelonero, Sliman Traoré, Samba Traoré and Sauroutou Diarra opened their first "French tacos" restaurant in Grenoble, in the Rhône-Alpes region where the French twist of a Mexican dish was pioneered. They later opened the first O'Tacos restaurant in Bordeaux in 2010. In 2014, they adopted the franchise system. The first restaurant under franchise opened in Ivry and 24 other restaurants followed during the same year.

=== International expansion ===
Their first international opening was in Marrakesh, Morocco. The chain then opened a restaurant in Brussels, Belgium, and their target customers are students. Since then it expanded further in Brussels as well as other Belgian cities including Ghent, Antwerp, Leuven and Charleroi. In January 2017, O'Tacos opened its first location in North America in the New York City borough of Brooklyn, later expanding to Canada, with the first location opening in Montreal in March 2025. The Brooklyn location has since closed.

== Products ==
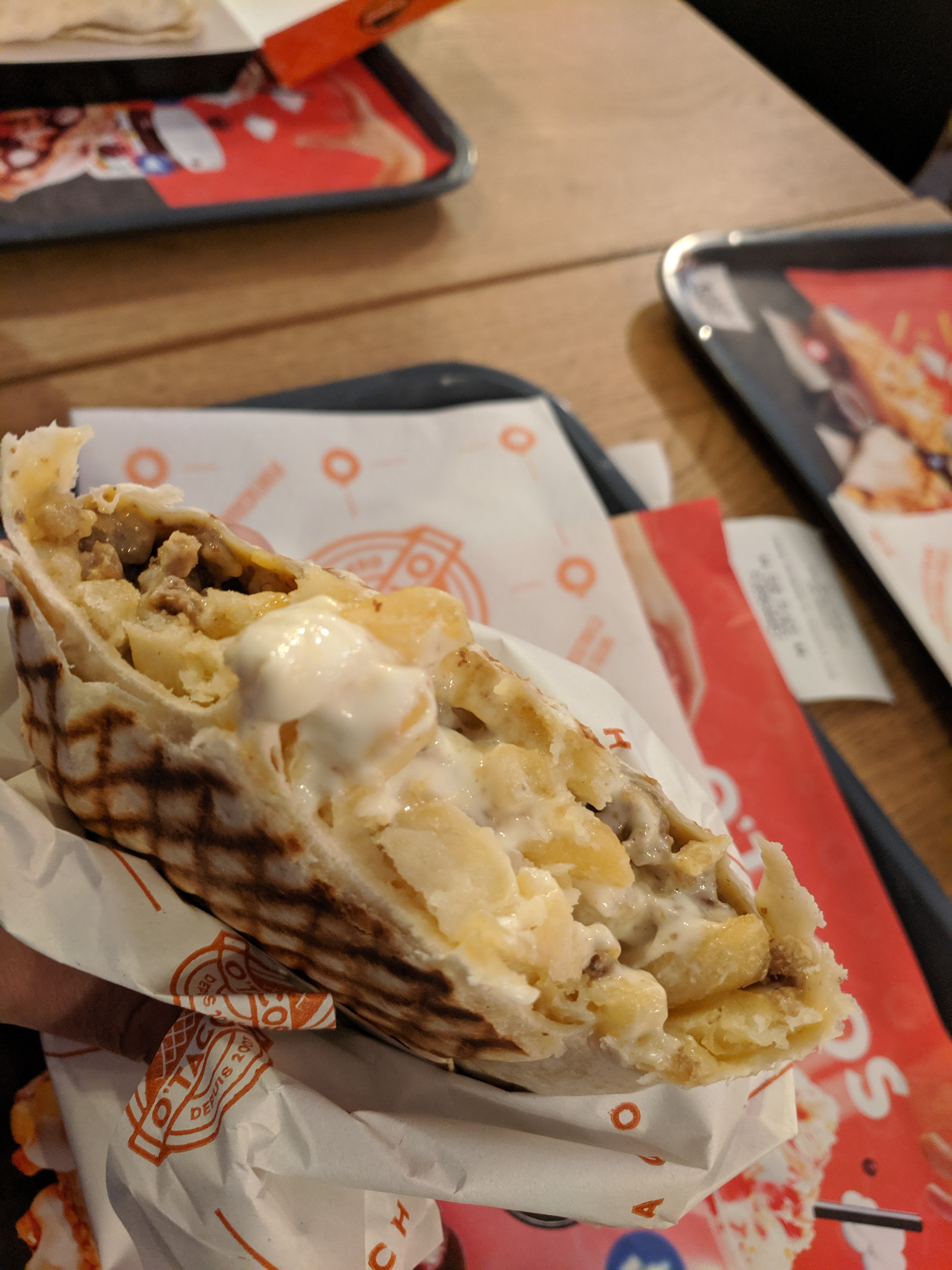
A French taco from O'Tacos

O'Tacos restaurants specialize in "French tacos", a fast food dish from the region of Rhône-Alpes in South-East France, which consists of a grilled flour tortilla folded around a filling of French fries, meat and cheese. They deliver made to order sandwiches, with customers getting to choose their own ingredients, such as the type of meat, sauce or additional ingredients, as well as the size (modeled after clothing sizes): M, L, XL, or XXL. Their signature product is the "Gigatacos" which weighs more than 2 kg (roughly 4.4 lbs). The chain uses halal-certified meat in order to accommodate Muslim customers.

== Controversies ==
=== Valenciennes restaurant ===
On September 12, 2017, the publicized opening of a franchised restaurant in Valenciennes (with the presence of rapper Gradur) ended in clashes between the police and youths who came to the event. The restaurant then had to be closed for a week for administrative reasons. On December 2, 2017, the restaurant almost caught fire because of an electrical issue with one of the refrigerators, and had to be closed for several weeks. After a stand-off between the local authorities and the franchise holders, the restaurant reopened in December, with many customers expressing their enthusiasm on social media. On March 26, 2018, a newly installed fryer caught fire, causing intervention from the fire department. The restaurant had to close again for a number of days.

=== Pigalle restaurant strike ===
An O’Tacos restaurant located in the Paris neighbourhood of Pigalle was closed on February 9, 2018, as 24 employees went on strike, accusing the manager of not paying them for months, falsifying pay slips and withholding annual leave. Some employees also complained about sexual harassment and assault from their manager. The chain then publicly stated that they "opened an internal investigation" and the manager's license was suspended.

=== Qwartz restaurant incident ===
On July 1, 2018, an expansion joint broke in a franchise located in the Qwartz mall in Villeneuve-la-Garenne, causing floor tiles to pop into the air. Panic ensued in part of the mall, as some customers believed they were in the midst of a terrorist attack, as reported by social media.

== See also ==
- List of fast food restaurant chains
