= Cuisine of Quebec =

Traditional and contemporary cuisine of Quebec

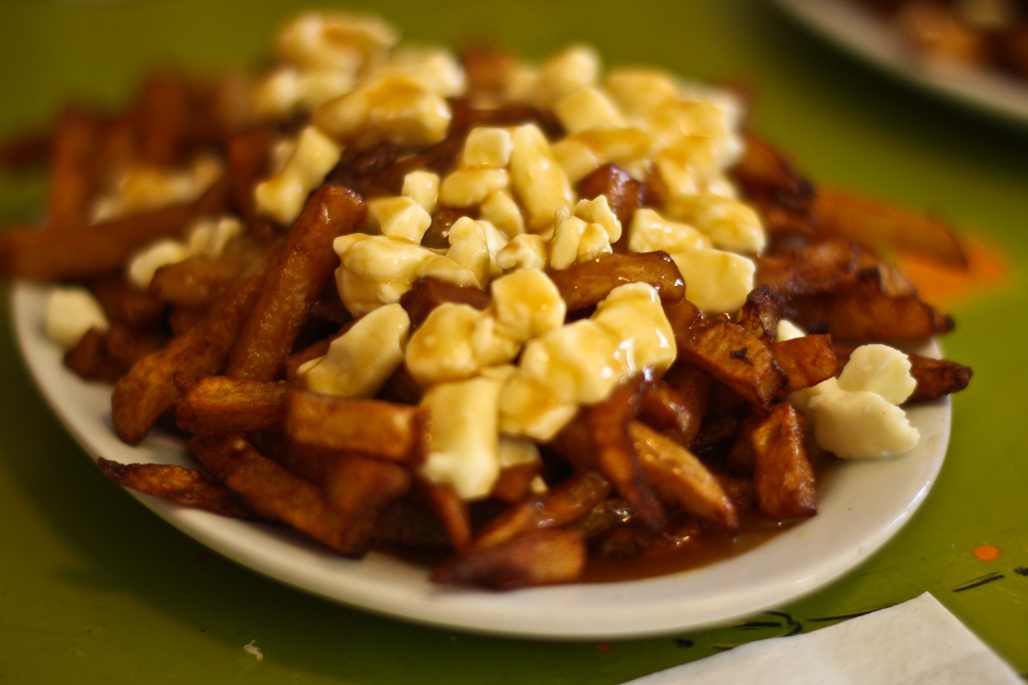
Poutine was created in Centre-du-Québec.

The cuisine of Quebec is the cuisine of the Canadian province of Quebec, comprising the national cuisine of French-Canadians (shared by Franco-Ontarians), the cuisine of Inuit and First Nations living in the province, and other dishes introduced to the province by later immigrant groups.

Quebec's cuisine originated from 17th-century French cuisine and began to develop in Canada (New France) from the labour-intensive nature of colonial life, the seasonality of ingredients and the need to conserve resources. It has been influenced by the province's history of fur trading and hunting, as well as Quebec's winters, soil fertility, borrowings from First Nations, British cuisine, American cuisine, historical trade relations and some immigrant cuisines.

Dishes associated with Quebec include poutine, tourtières, pâté chinois, pea soup, fèves au lard, cretons and desserts such as grands-pères, pouding chômeur and St. Catherine's taffy. These dishes are traditionally served during holidays and the temps des sucres, when families visit sugar shacks in March.

Quebec is known for being the biggest producer of maple syrup on the planet, as 72% of the maple syrup sold in the world (and 90% sold in Canada) originates from Quebec. The province is also recognized for having created over 700 different kinds of cheese, some of which have won international contests.

Food critic Jacob Richler wrote that Quebec's cuisine is better defined than that of the rest of Canada, due to its language barrier with the dominant culture of the United States and having had more time to develop. Conversely, Quebec's cuisine and Acadian cuisine have much in common due to proximity and a shared language and history.

== History ==
The cuisine of Quebec evolved from that of 17th-century Northern France. Foods that trace their origins back from there are: pot-au-feu, blood sausage (boudin), head cheese (tête fromagée), plorine sausages, ham hock stew (ragoût de pattes de cochon), rabbit stew (civet de lapin), French toast (pain perdu or pain doré), and pastries like crêpes, beignets, croquignole biscuits and tarts. As in France, pork is and has always been the most popular meat.

It also retains some heritage from Poitevin cuisine. Some French_Canadians make pâté marmite, soupe aux gourganes (made with a historical strain of fava bean, the gourgane bean), and soups based on other legumes. The charentaise chowders (chaudrées charentaises) have evolved into the quiaudes of Gaspesia and the tourtes salées of Poitiers into tourtières.

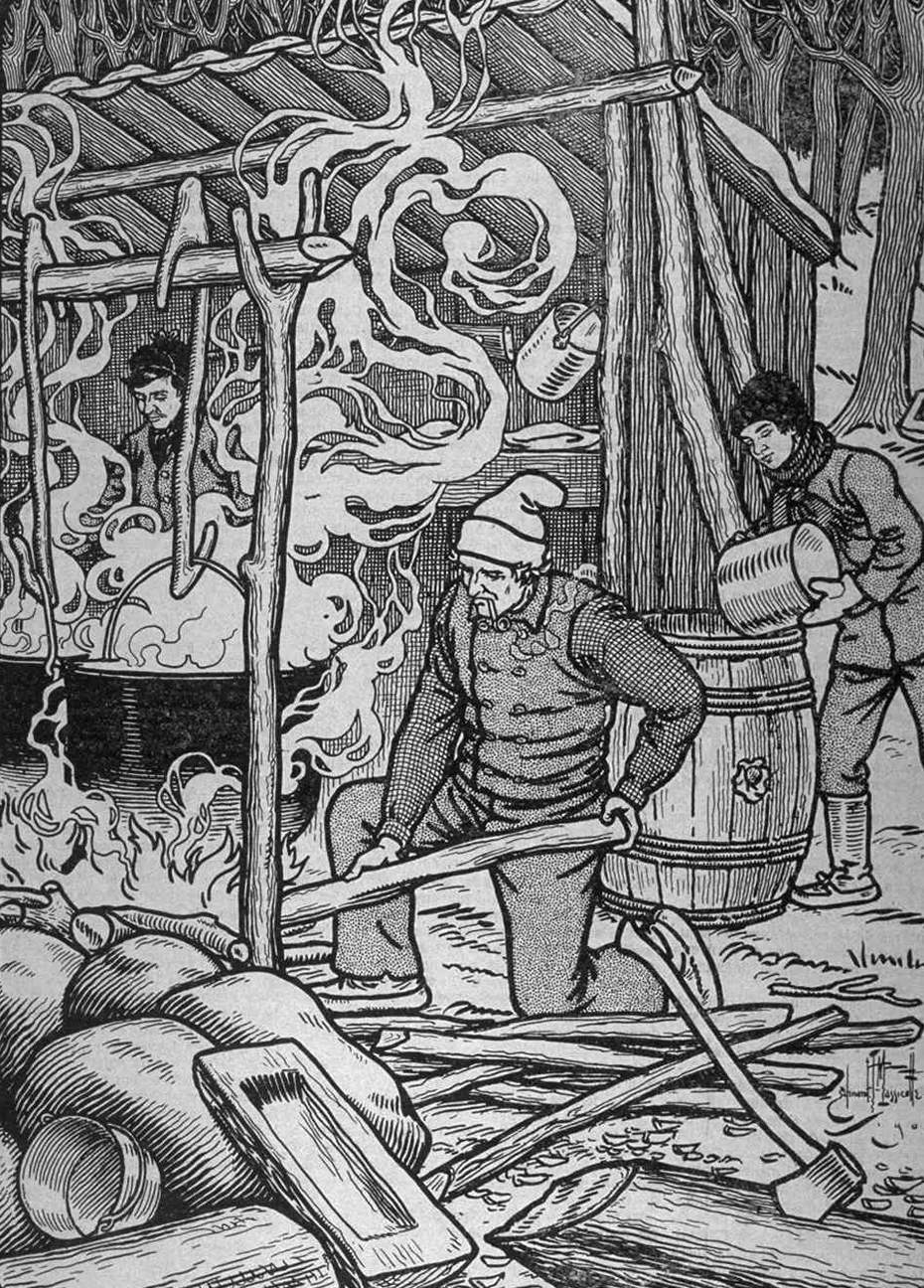
Québécois workers collecting and processing maple sap to create maple syrup.

From the moment they arrived in Canada (New France) in the early 1600s, French colonists always preferred their native cuisine. However, they learned some culinary techniques from the Algonquins, Atikamekw and Iroquois. The most important ones were l’acériculture (the process of harvesting maple sap and creating maple syrup), ice fishing, and boucanage (in which fish or other meat is smoked for preservation and flavour).^{11}

Food preservation was always important in pioneer times, due to long winters and to the frequent voyages of coureurs des bois. Butter, herbs, and lard were used for seasoning and salting. Pork and fish were boucanés, while other meats and vegetables were preserved in vinegar. These techniques are still practiced today, though not for survival. As game was so plentiful, pioneers and their descendants always hunted and fished for sustenance.

By the 1670s, a substantial agrarian population had emerged in the region of Québec City, since the fertile soils of the St. Lawrence Lowlands allowed most European crops to grow well. But, the long winters pushed people to prioritize vegetables that would store well in root cellars like cabbages, carrots, turnips and onions. During meals, French habits dominated, almost always featuring soup, bread, meat, and wine. Since the climate made it difficult to grow European grapes (namely, Vitis vinifera), wines were always imported from France.^{12}

Since only Catholics were allowed to immigrate, Habitants followed Catholic dietary rules and attitudes, like no meat on Fridays or during Lent (minus fish, eggs, dairy), special foods on feast days (ex. tourtière on Christmas Eve), sugar and fat being earned indulgences, and alcohol consumption being normal (not viewed with suspicion like with Protestants). Religious charities like monasteries, convents, boarding schools, and orphanages gave free meals to thousands daily using economical recipes like soups, stews, porridges and bread.

The Conquest of New France in 1760 brought some culinary changes to the colony. One of the immediate effects was the elimination of wine, as it could no longer be imported from France. Spirits became the drink of choice since they were the dominant alcohol traded in the British Empire. Another major change was the importation of the potato, which, in only a few decades, became a staple ingredient in Québec, dethroning bread in popularity. Sugar consumption also increased. Finally, the British imported many recipes like mashed potatoes, crumble, and meat pies.

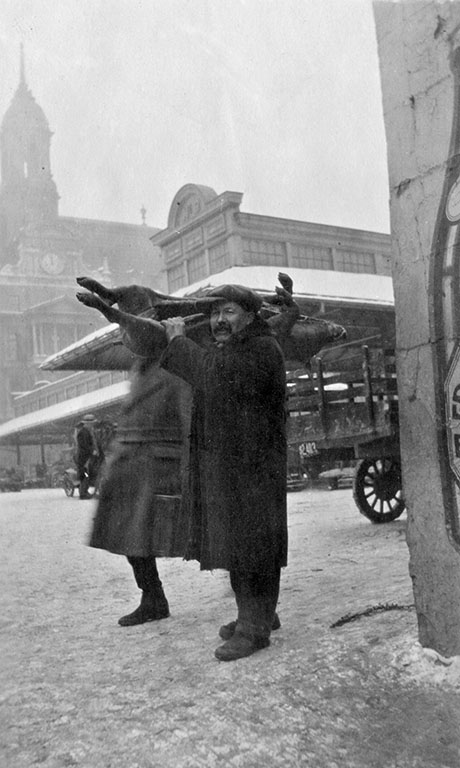
The selling of pork in marché Bonsecours in 1926.

Because tensions with the young United States alleviated, the period following the Aroostook War in 1839 saw increased interaction between Canada and New England. Some recipes inspired by the cultural exchange included fèves au lard, ketchup aux fruits, and date squares.^{4} The socio-economic standing of French Canadians also fell to deplorable levels; the intense poverty pushed them to simplify their meals. Recipes for bouillon were now almost nothing more than warm water. Alcoholic beverages were rarely consumed, and butter was either used sparingly or absent. Some famine foods like ploye emerged during this period. Lastly, the 1800s also saw the gradual dethroning of spirits by beer, aided by industrialized beer productions, high British immigration and the expansion of railways.

By the early 1900s, conditions had improved somewhat, though French Canadians were still poor. Most families would often eat a mix of potatoes and pork on their plate, which is still a staple combination today. During this period, the passenger pigeon, called tourte in French, also became extinct. Because this bird's meat had been used to fill the pie-like dishes known as tourtières, the tourtière recipe had to change. Farm-raised meats like beef and pork were usually chosen as the substitutes.^{3}

The Great Depression of the 1930s saw the creation of pâté chinois ("Chinese pie") and pouding chômeur ("unemployed man's pudding").^{5} Immigration in the early 20th century diversified; immigrants no longer came only from the British Isles but also from other parts of Europe. Jewish specialties like bagels and Eastern Europe-style smoked meat were introduced to Montreal, resulting in the creation of Montreal-style smoked meat and Montreal-style bagels.^{17}

The 1950s saw many big changes in the eating habits of Quebec. The popularity of fast-food grew enormously, aided by the rise of the car, so many dishes including spaghetti, pizza, turkey, bacon, sausages, industrial cheeses, hamburgers, hot dogs, french fries, coleslaw and lobster rolls become popular. Raw milk was banned, resulting in many old cheese recipes being abandoned and new ones created. Many fruits and vegetables became available year-round thanks to refrigerators and larger supply chains. Homemade bread was replaced with more convenient store-bought sandwich breads.^{6} Finally, though coffee was once reserved for the elite, the appearance of affordable instant coffee made it popular across a broader range of society.

In the late 1950s, these changes brought about the creation of poutine—arguably the most famous Quebec dish—as well as other dishes, like hot chicken and guédilles.

The Quiet Revolution of the 1960s to 1970s greatly improved the socio-economic standing of French-Canadians and other people living in the province, allowing them to have a more diverse diet. It set the stage for high-quality products to be created in Quebec and for the emergence of new restaurants, for example Lafleur, Valentine, La Belle Province or St-Hubert. It also resulted in the end of many Catholic dietary traditions such as meatless Fridays - though some traditions like feast days persist to this day - and of religious institutions providing free food, in favour of government welfare for the needy.

From the 1980s to today, a desire for higher quality foods, more spending power, and an influence by immigrants from Europe — particularly Italy, Greece, France, Belgium and Portugal — has led to the rise of the creation and production of high-quality cheeses and alcoholic beverages across Québec, as well as a return to recipes of the terroir.^{13} Immigration from Greece has popularized gyros and brought about souvlaki pitas. Immigrants from Lebanon have popularized shawarmas which has created shish taouk. NAFTA and the new culture of Quebecers vacationing south has resulted in the adoption of Western-style sushi and Tex-Mex dishes like nachos, fajitas, salsa, chili and burritos.

Several changes in the realm of drinks also took place. Starting in 1986, Quebec began to foster a microbrewery culture (called "microbrasserie") and was the first province to do so. The third wave of coffee, emphasizing artisanal quality, began to take root in the 2000s and spread across Quebec in the 2010s. Finally, bubble tea first appeared in Montreal's Chinatown in the 2000s and gained broader popularity in the late 2010s, boosted by social media.

== Ingredients ==
=== Game, seafood, and fish ===
Many families in Quebec hunted for food until the mid 20th century.^{19} Tourtières were stuffed with the meat of the tourte, or passenger pigeon, which used to be common and easy prey. But, by the early 20th century, the passenger pigeon became extinct due to overhunting, deforestation, and the Allee effect.^{11} Families had to replace the meat with whatever they had. As a result, most modern tourtières are filled with beef or pork.

Today, the consumption of game remains a tradition, although game is not sold in grocery stores. When available, people in Quebec eat meat from moose, deer, hares, ruffed grouse, wild turkey, waterfowl and more rather than that of livestock. Game is also sometimes given as a gift.

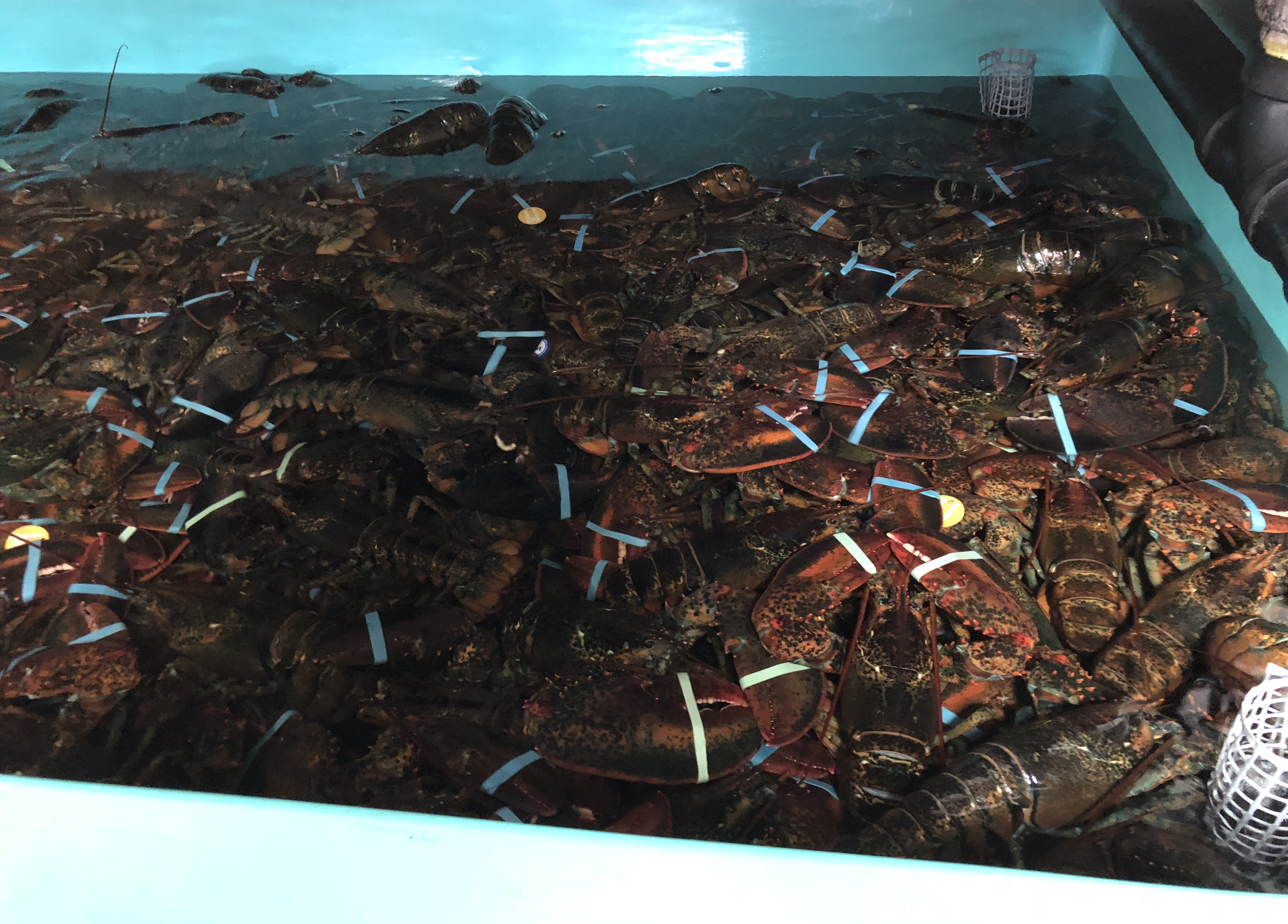
Lobsters fished in Gaspesia that are ready to be sold.

As for seafood, lobster and crab are caught in Gaspesia, la Côte-Nord, and the Magdalen Islands to be sold to the rest of Quebec. Shrimp is often marketed as crevette de Matane after the shrimp-processing factory in the town of Matane. However, the shrimp themselves are caught in several villages on the Saint Lawrence River estuary. Mussels, oysters, scallops, and whelks (bourgots) are also caught.

Salmon and trout are the most popular fish in Quebec. The brook trout is nearly ubiquitous, salmon is farmed and can be caught in 118 different rivers, and Arctic char is present across nearly 100 lakes. Other fished species include lake trout, yellow perch, walleye, muskellunge, Northern pike, micropterus, rainbow smelt, Greenland halibut, mackerel, lake sturgeon, lake whitefish, Atlantic cod (Eastern Québec), Atlantic herring (Eastern Québec), American eel (between Trois-Rivières and Cap-Chat), ouananiche (a kind of freshwater salmon; Lac Saint-Jean),^{2} frostfish (Sainte-Anne-de-la-Pérade), deepwater redfish (Saguenay fjords), capelin (coastal villages), and brown bullhead (Îles de Sorel).

Sainte-Anne-de-la-Pérade holds a world-renowned festival every December to February called La pêche des petits poisons des chenaux, where ice fishers catch tomcods. Historically, starving French colonists learned ice fishing techniques from the Atikamekw—a privilege, as the technique was kept a secret from neighbouring First Nations.

=== Livestock ===
Pork is the meat used most often in French-Canadian recipes. Beef is also commonly used but has been losing popularity in recent years. In summer, beef commonly features in barbecues.

The pigs of Quebec are mostly hybrids of the Duroc, Yorkshire, and American Landrace breeds. The cattle are also hybrids of many breeds; the Aberdeen Angus, Charolais, and Limousin are the most common. Despite the large cattle population, Quebec imports most of its beef from the Canadian West, using its own cattle mostly for dairy. Milk production is dominated by the Holstein, but Jersey or Brown Swiss cows are also milked.

Poultry is commonly consumed. Chicken is the most popular by far, but turkey and duck are also consumed. Chicken eggs are very popular and mostly used at breakfast and to make pastries. Turkey is traditionally served at Christmas and Thanksgiving with croutons and sage. The Estrie region has produced duck since the early 20th century. Quebec is also the only producer of foie gras in Canada, as well as its largest producer in North America.

Horse is eaten marginally- by less than 1% of the population. Its consumption is considered taboo, though it is not illegal.

Other meats include lamb, veal, rabbit, bison, elk and frog legs (from American bullfrogs and leopard frogs).

=== Spices, sweeteners and cereals ===
Spices common in traditional recipes are linked to local production and historical commerce: salt, savory, cloves, cinnamon, parsley, thyme, sage, nutmeg, quatres épices, chives, garlic, oregano and bay leaf.^{4}^{11} Thanks to globalisation, a wider selection of international spices are available today, like turmeric, curry powder, allspice, cumin, cayenne pepper, etc. In recent years, chefs have attempted to create excitement for the flavours of the boreal forest; among them are green alder pepper, sweetfern, caraway seed, sweetgale, and juniper berry.

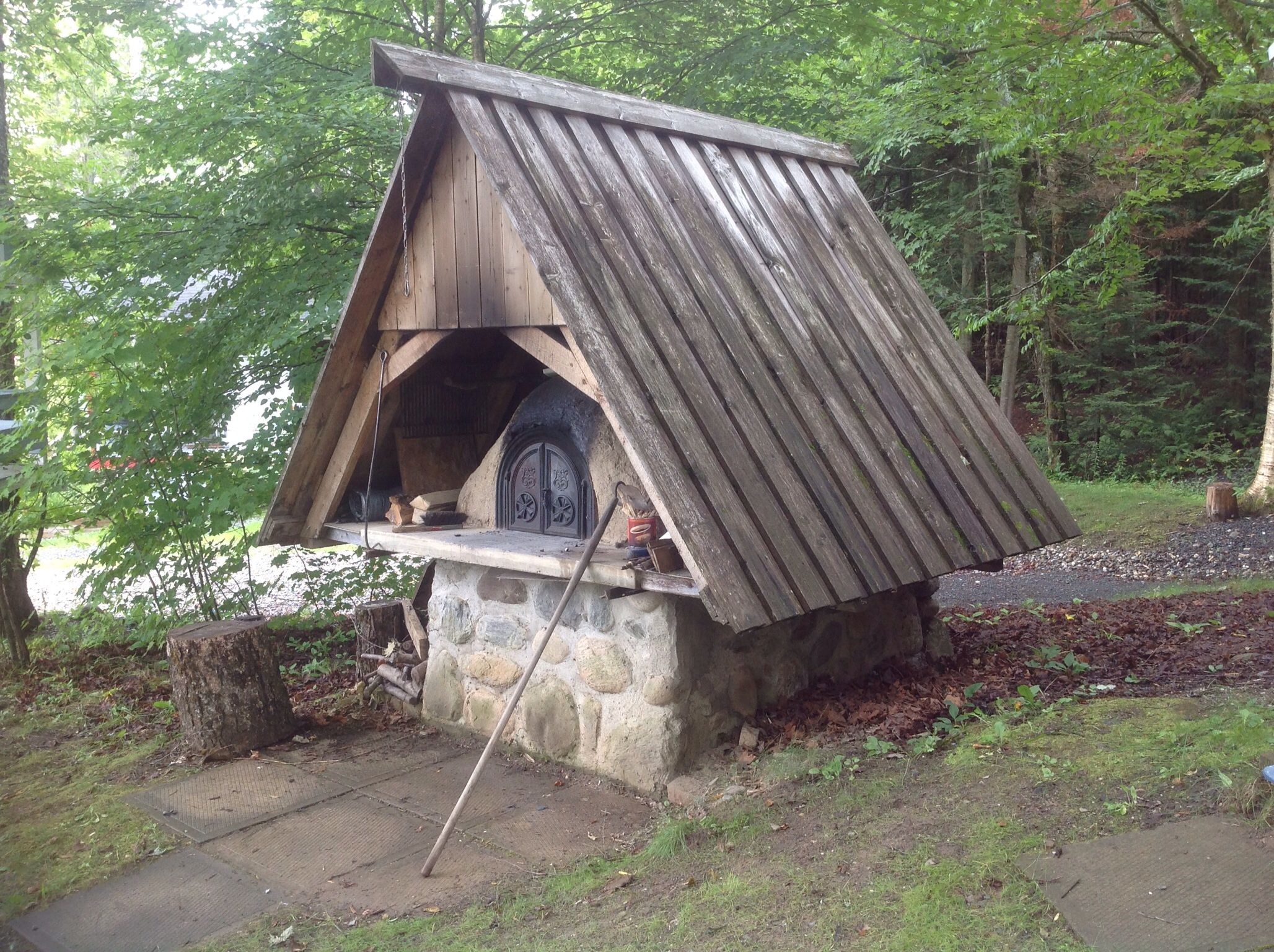
Ancestral bread oven of Québec in Saint-Damien-de-Bellechasse.

The types of sugar used are white sugar, brown sugar and maple sugar. Maple syrup is used to sweeten breakfasts, meats, and pastries. Honey is almost exclusively used for desserts, but it is also used as toast spread. Molasses and raisins are common ingredients in traditional recipes because of historical commerce with the Antilles and Brazil.^{11}

Traditional and most common cereals are wheat, rice, oat and buckwheat. Buckwheat became popular because it could grow well on the Canadian Shield.^{1} Nowadays, a few other cereals have managed to gain a small presence: quinoa, wild rice, chia seeds, and barley.

=== Fruits and vegetables ===
The most commonly used vegetables in traditional French-Canadian cuisine were those that can easily be preserved to last throughout the winter, either kept in a cool storage area like a root cellar or brined in jars. These vegetables are potato, onion, carrot, beet, pumpkin, squash (butternut, spaghetti, acorn, etc.), zucchini, beans, cabbage, turnip, and corn. In modern times, Québécois also cook with store-bought tomato, bell pepper, cucumber, lettuce, asparagus, cauliflower, broccoli, avocado, microgreens, radish, shallot, spinach, parsnip, eggplant, artichoke, kale, leek, rutabaga, sweet potato, celery, lentil, peanut, soybean, chickpea and others. Rhubarb is typically grown in backyard gardens. Fiddleheads are gathered from the wild in the spring.

Frequently eaten berries are the blueberry,^{2} strawberry, raspberry, blackberry, grape, cherry and cranberry. The goldenberry is uncommonly imported from South America. Cloudberries only grow in the wilds of the boreal forest, but are still gathered seasonally in northern communities. Finally, as these plants were banned on the continent in the early 20th century and were, with time, forgotten, all types of gooseberries or currants are virtually unknown in Quebec.

Other important locally-grown fruits are the apple, pear, plum, cantaloupe and watermelon. The most eaten imported fruits are: banana, orange, lemon, lime, kiwi, coconut, mango, clementine and pineapple. Other imported -but less popular- fruits include: pomegranate, grapefruit, starfruit, papaya, dragon fruit, passionfruit, fig and others.

Mushrooms have long been absent from traditional French-Canadian cuisine. However, they are present now, and almost always of the cremini variety. In recent years, morchella, chanterelle, shiitake and enokis mushrooms have also gained a small presence.

== Examples of unique dishes ==
=== Entrées or side dishes ===
- Betteraves marinées—pickled beets
- Cretons—forcemeat-style pork spread containing onions and spices
- Fèves au lard—beans slow-cooked with bacon and maple syrup
- Ketchup aux fruits—green or red sauce made with sugar, vinegar, tomatoes, onions, apples and spices
- Soupe aux gourganes—soup showcasing the traditional gourgane bean
- Soupe à l'orge perlé—soup showcasing pearl barley
- Soupe aux pois—soup showcasing peas
- Oreilles de crisse—a dish consisting of deep-fried salted fatback
- Quiaude—a chowder that uses white fish
- Fried macaroni—a Canadian Chinese stir fry that includes macaroni, meat and vegetables
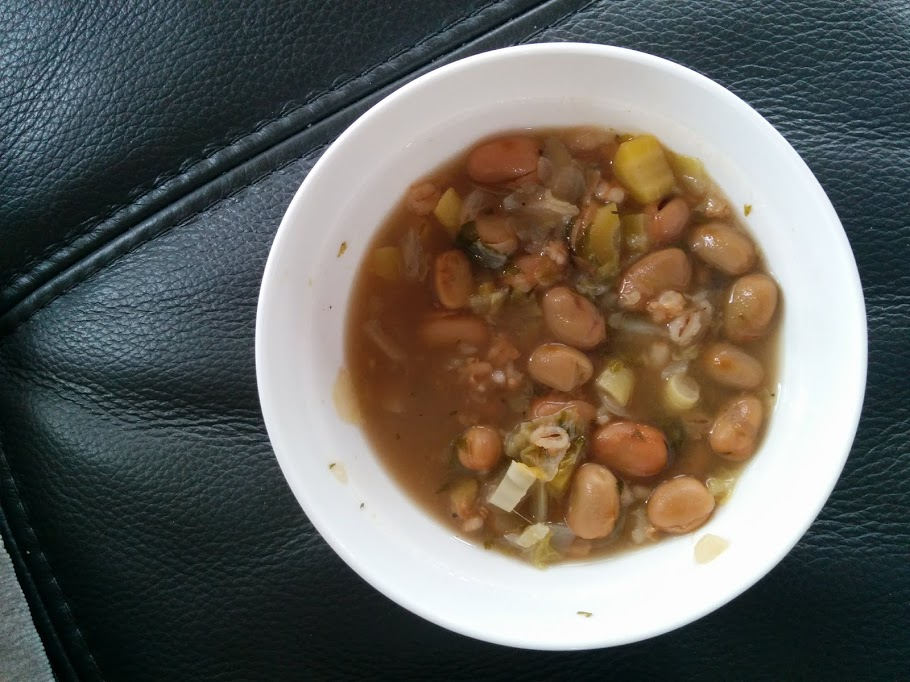
Soupe aux gourganes.

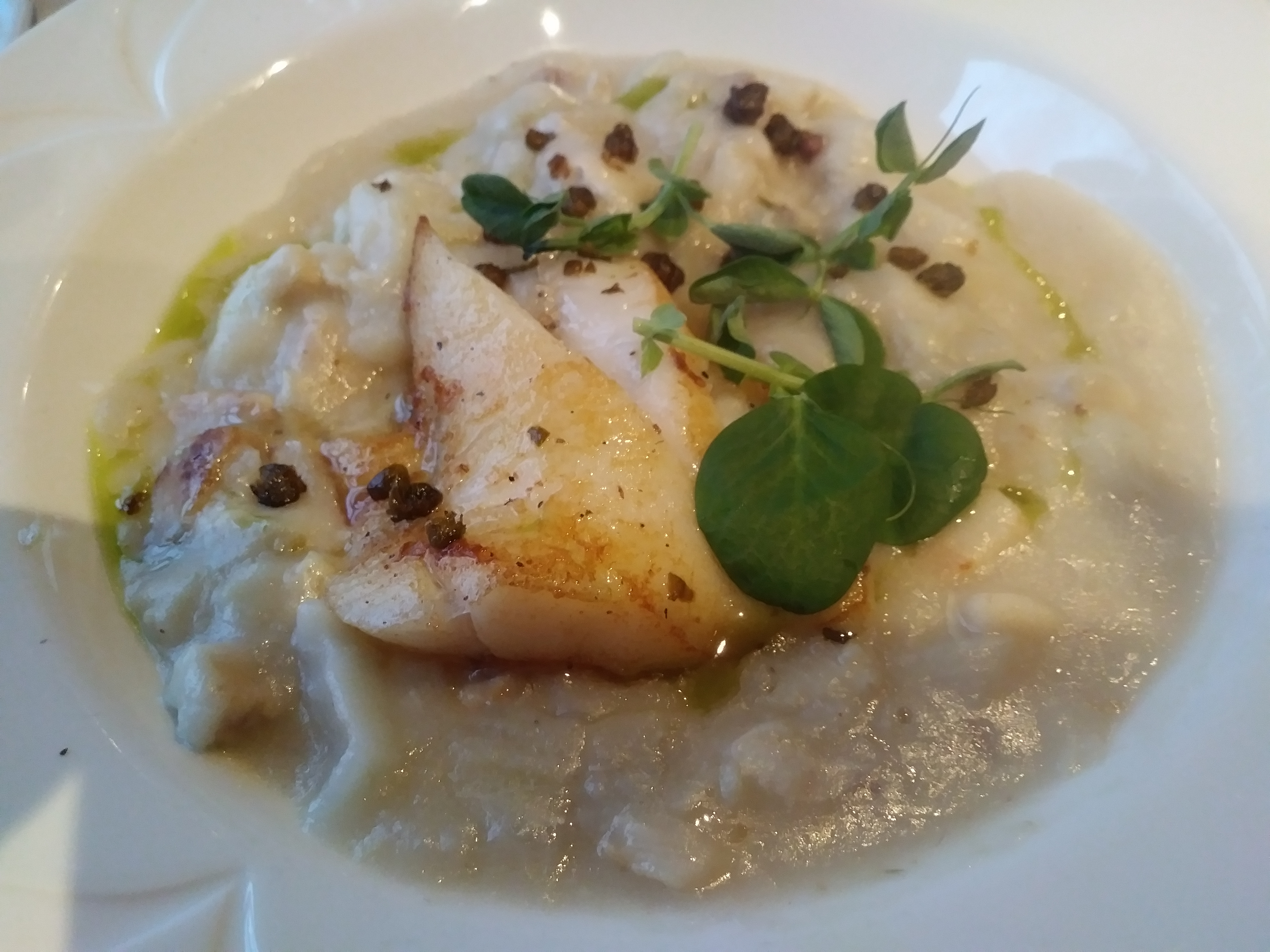
Quiaude made with Greenland halibut.

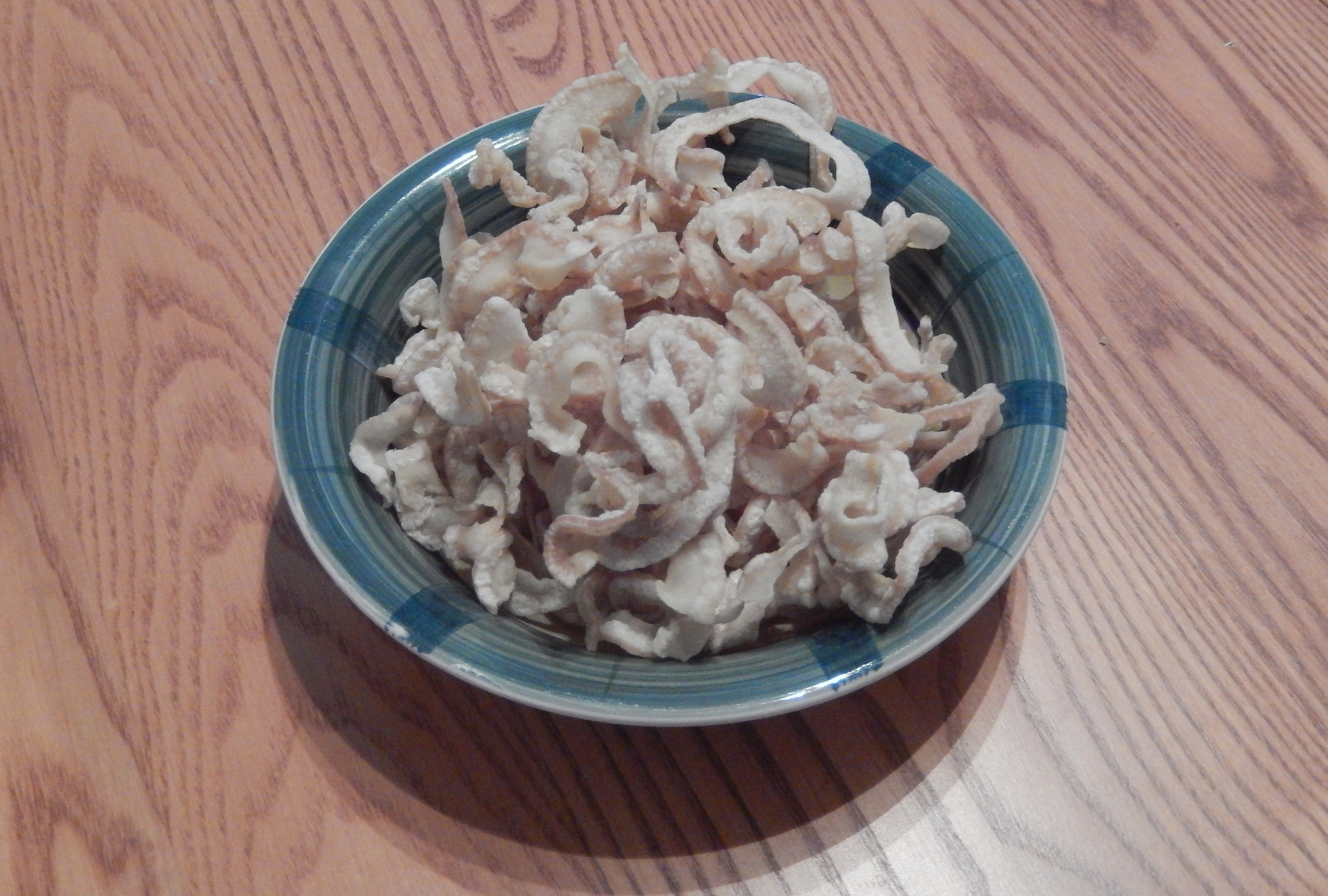
Oreilles de crisse in a bowl.

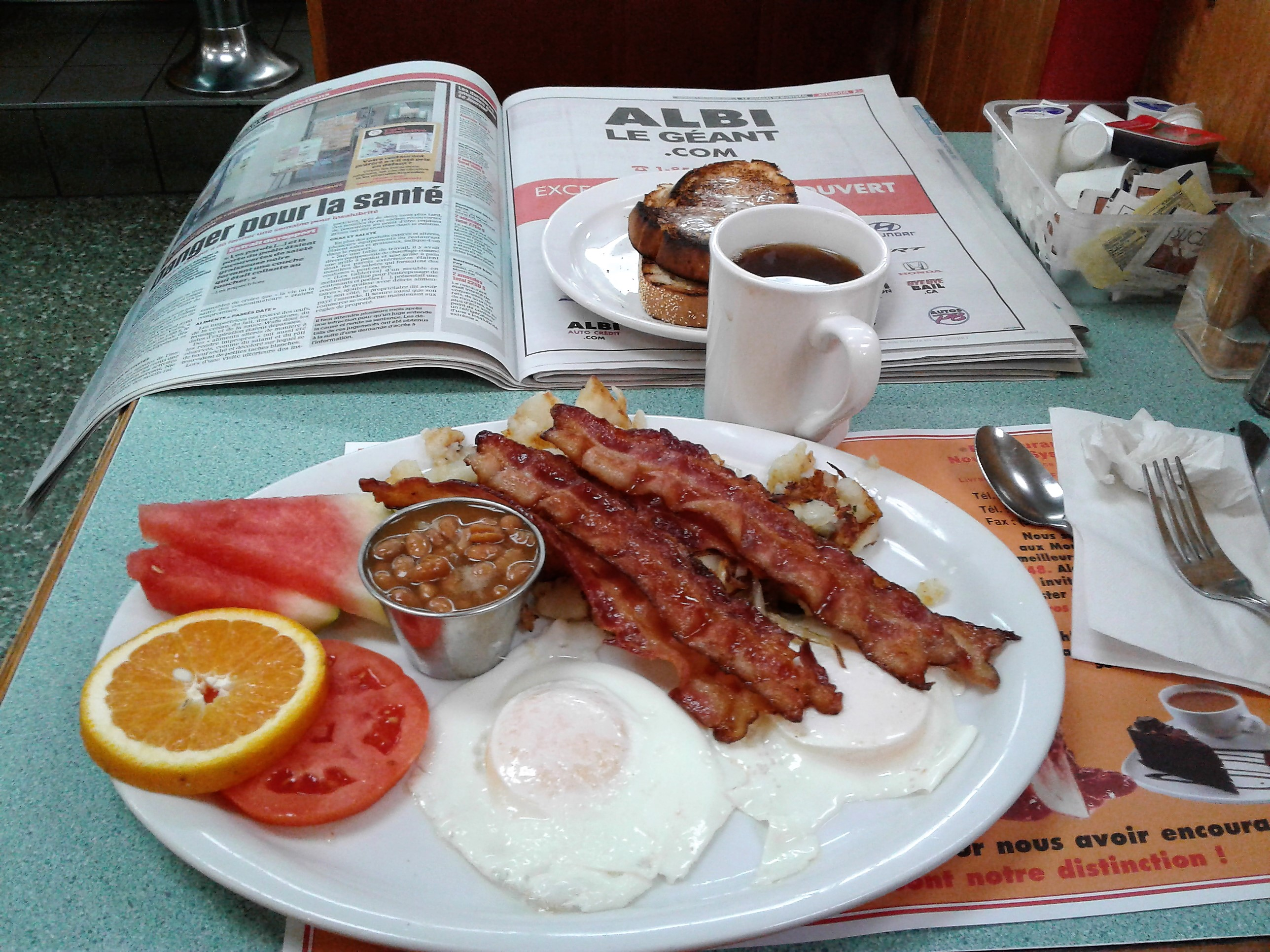
Breakfast with fèves au lard in a small bowl as a side.

=== Main course ===
- Bouilli de légumes—a bouillon of traditional ingredients and spices
- Chiard—pork stew with potatoes and onions
- Cigares au chou—ground beef cabbage rolls with a homemade ketchup or tomato sauce coating
- Coquille Saint-Jacques—seafood chowder surrounded by mashed potatoes and covered with cheese
- Feuilleté jambon-fromage—rolled-up pastries with ham and cheese in the middle, looks like cinnamon buns
- Galette aux patates—potato pancake
- Gibelotte de Sorel—soup made with a tomato base, several vegetables and white fish, dish originally from Sorel-Tracy
- Guédille—lobster roll on a hot dog bun; other seafood may be used instead of lobster
- Hot chicken—a chicken sandwich with gravy and peas served on top
- Pâté chinois— pâté consisting of a layer of ground beef at the bottom, either whole kernel or creamed corn in the centre and mashed potatoes on top. It is also called "Shepherd's pie" in English.
- Pizza-ghetti— a combination meal commonly found in fast food or family restaurants, another variety is the Pizza-caesar
- Pot-au-feu de la récolte—pork or beef pot-au-feu with traditional vegetables (ex. carrots, cabbage, etc.)
- Poulet chasseur—floured chicken cooked with certain vegetables and tomato sauce
- Poutine—french fries topped with cold or room temperature cheese curds and hot gravy, the most famous Québécois dish
- Poutine variants—variations on the classic poutine
- Ragoût de boulettes—a type of complex meatball ragoût
- Ragoût de pattes de cochon—a type of complex ragoût made using pig feet
- Tête fromagée—a solid structure made from a mix of pork, spices, onions, carrots and celery
- Souvlaki pita — the Quebec version of the gyros or Nova Scotian donair, largely inspired by 20th-century Greek immigrants and today popular in many pizzerias and patateries
- Tourtière—pie usually made with minced pork or beef, a signature dish of the temps des fêtes
- Tourtière du Lac-Saint-Jean—a type of tourtière made with a thicker crust and with cubes of potatoes, meats and broth
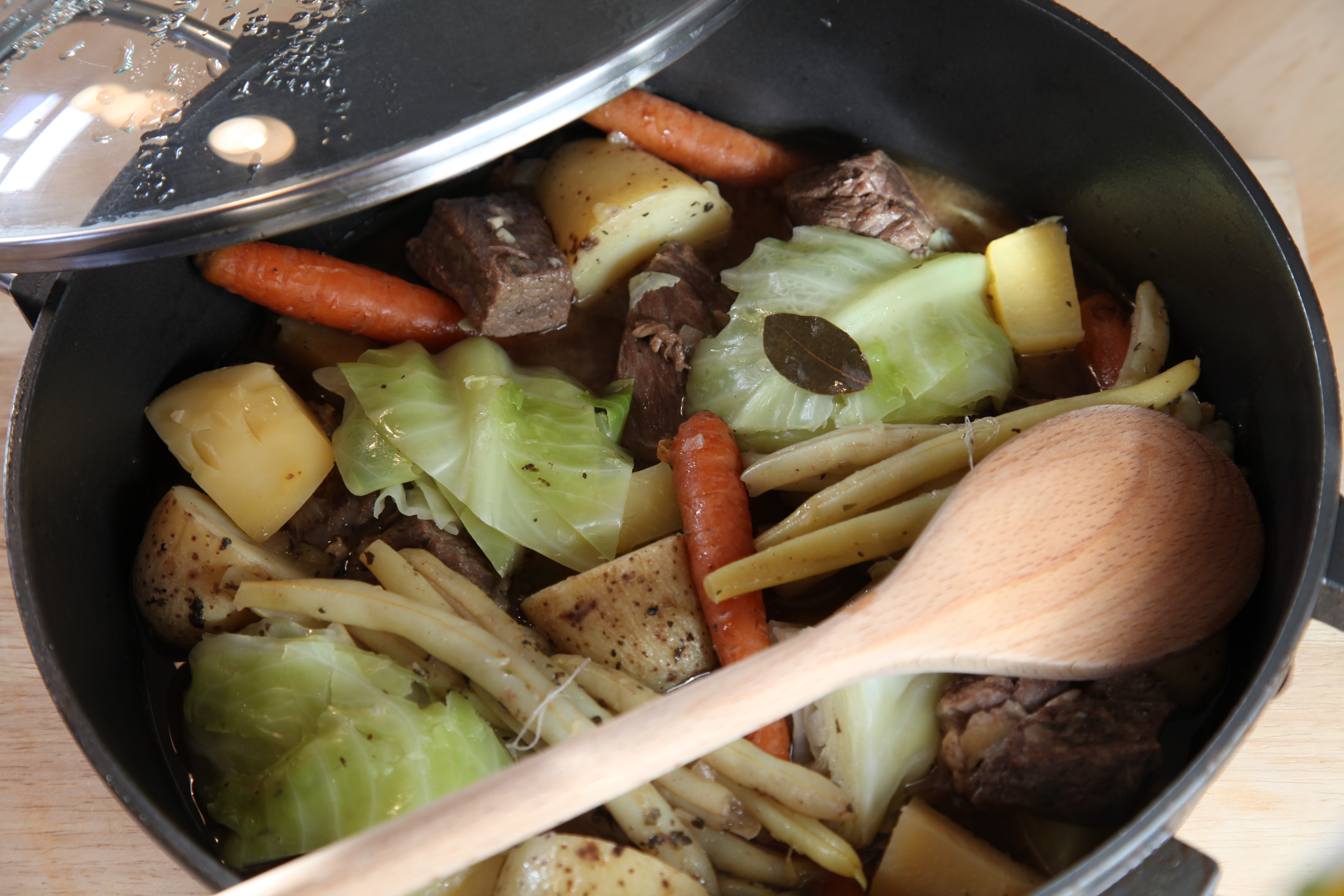
Bouilli de légumes, also called bouilli Québécois.

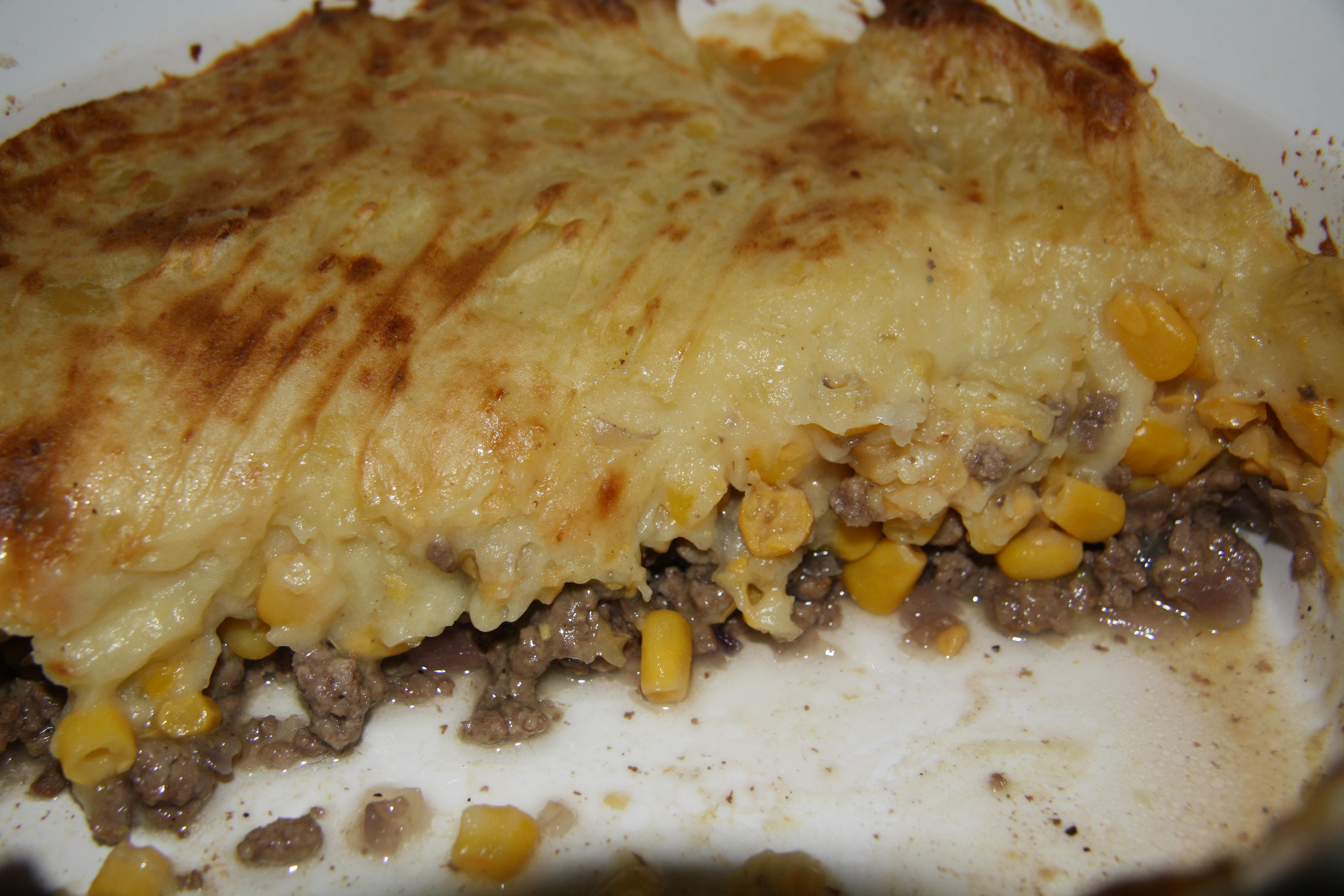
Pâté chinois is often eaten with ketchup.

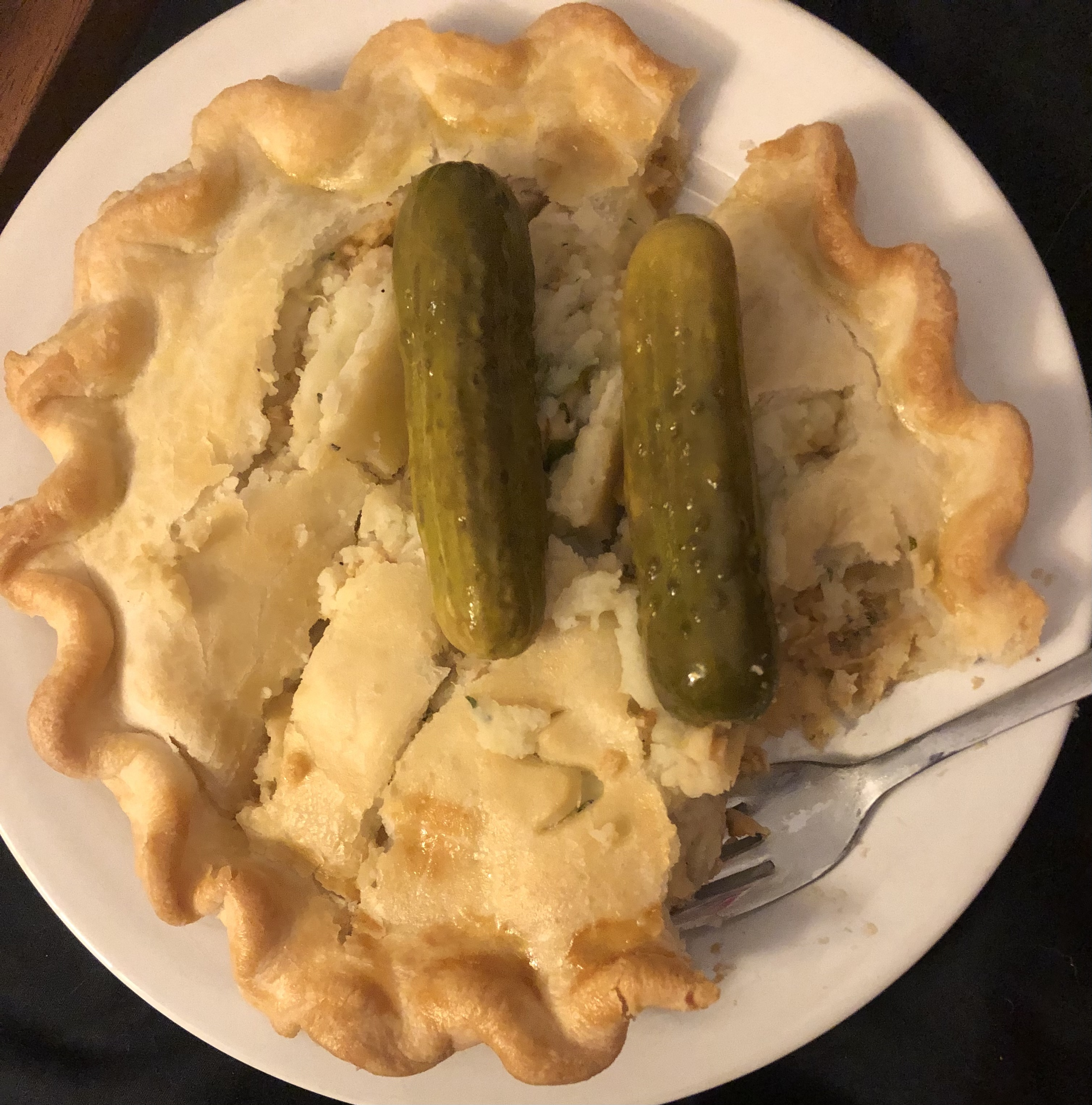
Traditional pâté au saumon with pickles.

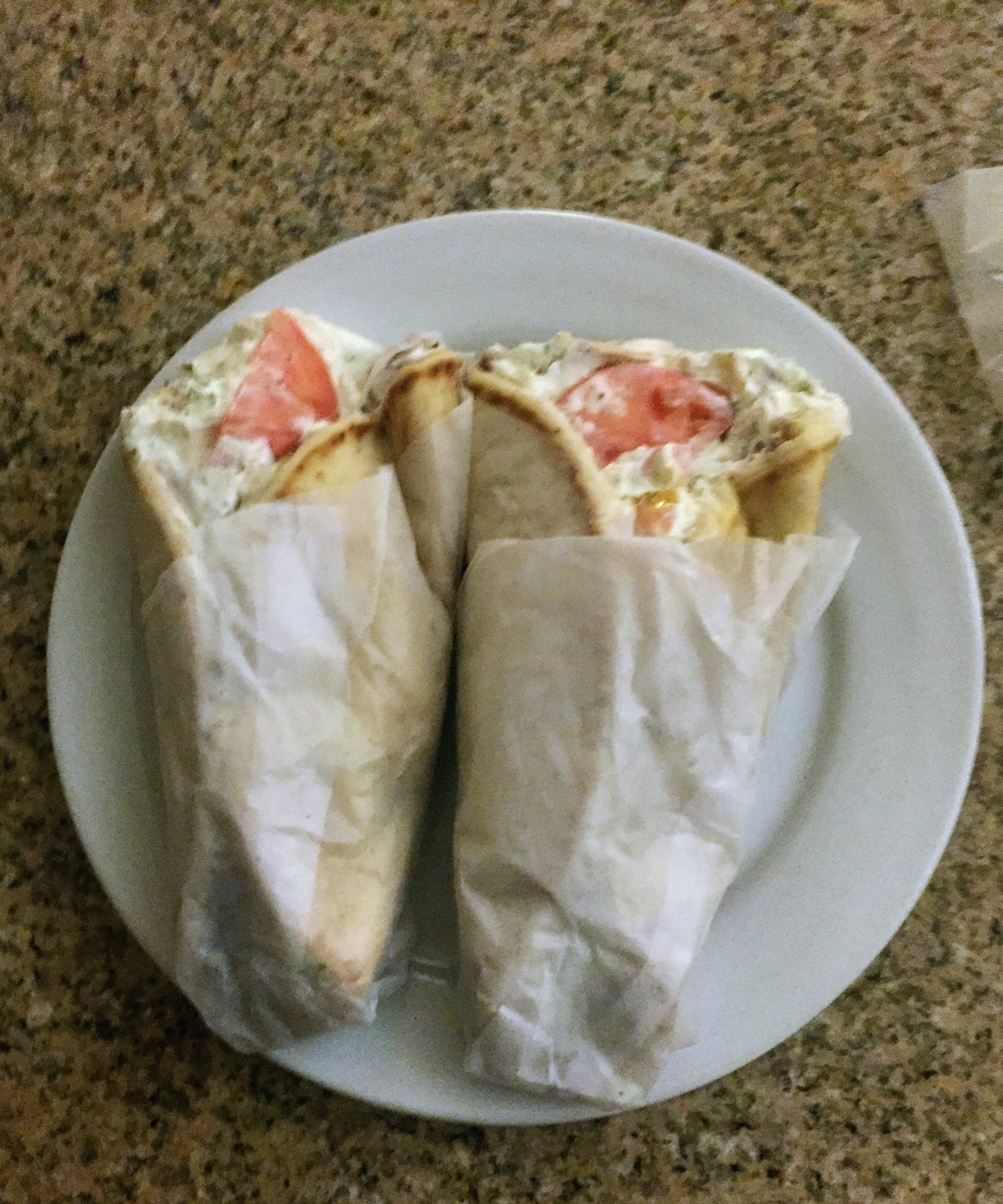
Quebec-style souvlaki pita (comparable to the Nova Scotian donair).

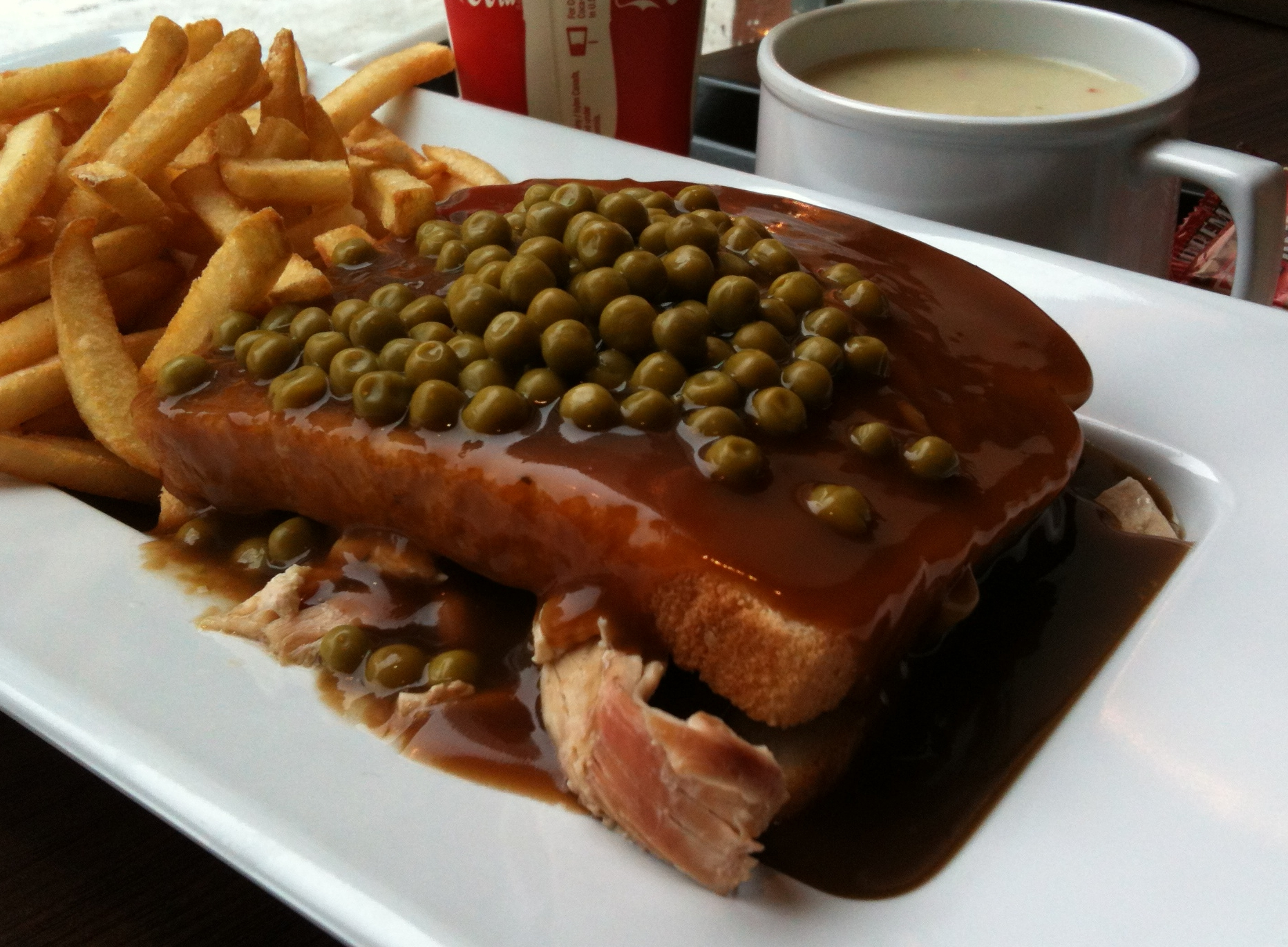
A Quebec-style "hot chicken", topped with green peas.

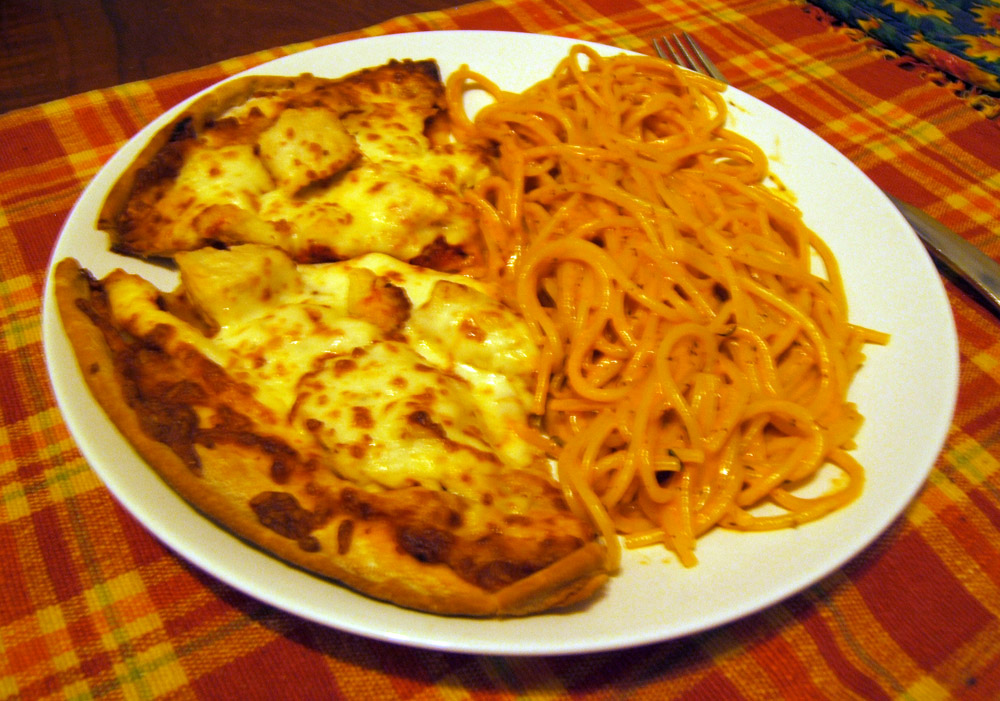
"Pizza-ghetti", a staple in many family restaurants and diners.

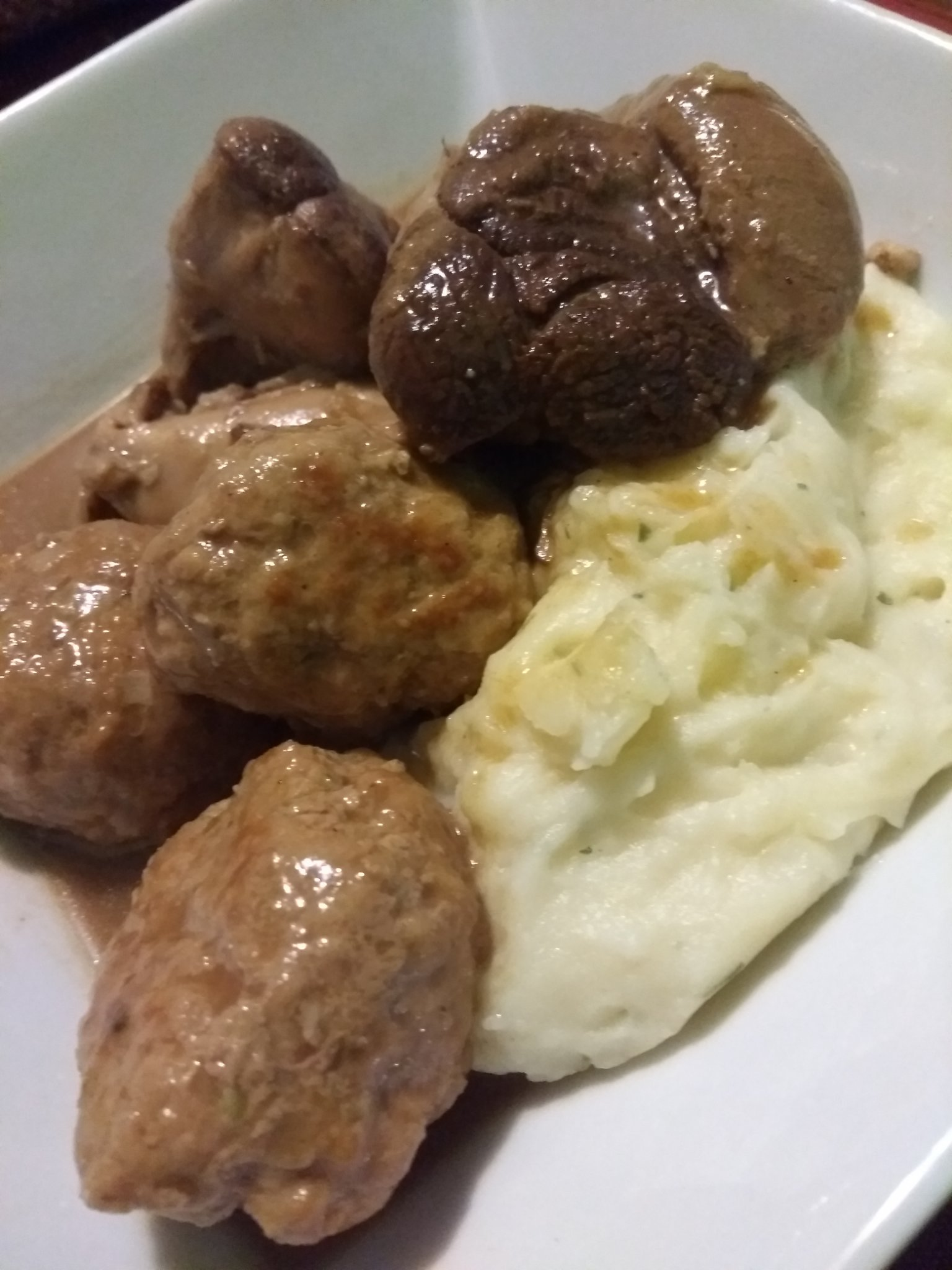
Mix of ragoût de boulettes and ragoût de pattes de cochon with mashed potatoes.

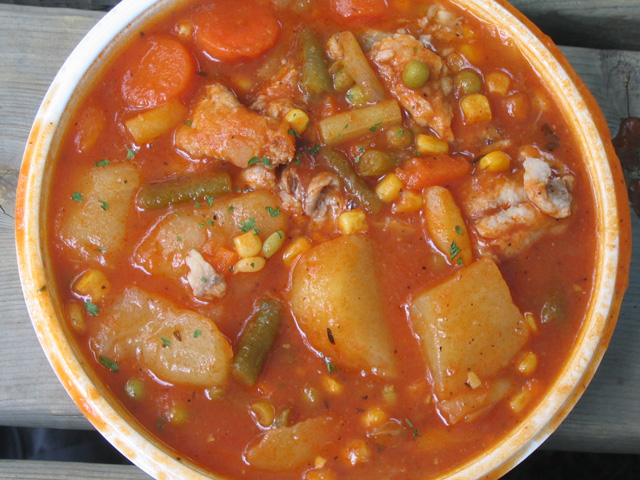
Gibelotte de Sorel is a soup eaten as a meal.

=== Desserts ===
- Beigne à l'ancienne—old-fashioned doughnuts
- Beigne aux patates—potato doughnuts
- Bonbons aux patates—potato candy
- Bûche de Noël—Yule log
- Galette à la mélasse—molasses cookies
- Gâteau Reine Élisabeth—type of cake made with dates, walnuts and coconut icing
- Gâteau au pain d'épices—cake made with certain spices
- Grands-pères—wrinkly ball-shaped cake often covered with maple syrup or stuffed with a fruit-based filling
- Pets de sœurs—rolled-up pastry with a brown sugar filling, looks like cinnamon buns
- Pouding chômeur—white cake laying in a maple-syrup based pudding
- Queue de castor—oval-shaped fried dough covered in a sweet garnish
- Sucre à la crème—cubes of sugar, cream and brown sugar, similar to Scottish tablet
- Tarte à la ferlouche—pie made with raisins, molasses and brown sugar
- Tarte au sucre—pie made from a sugar-based filling
- Tarte au suif—pie made from a sweet beef-fat based filling
- Tire de la Sainte-Catherine—a kind of sweet taffy, created to celebrate the Saint Catherine of Alexandria
- Tire sur neige—boiling maple sap laid on snow and rolled up on a popsicle stick
- Trottoir—strawberry or blueberry-based pie whose upper crust has a pattern of rhombus-shaped holes
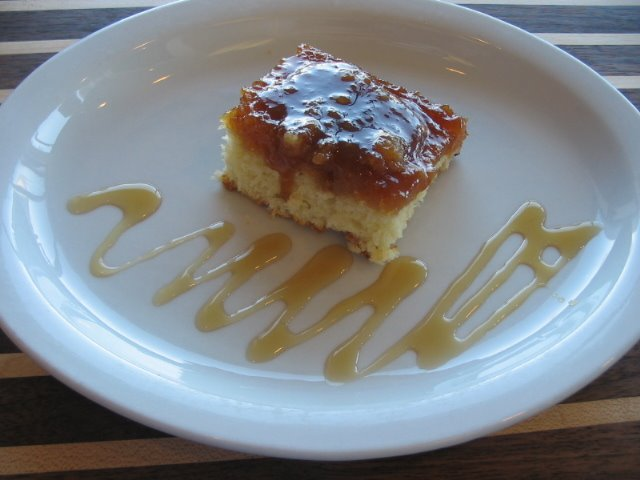
Pouding-chômeur was created during the Great Depression.

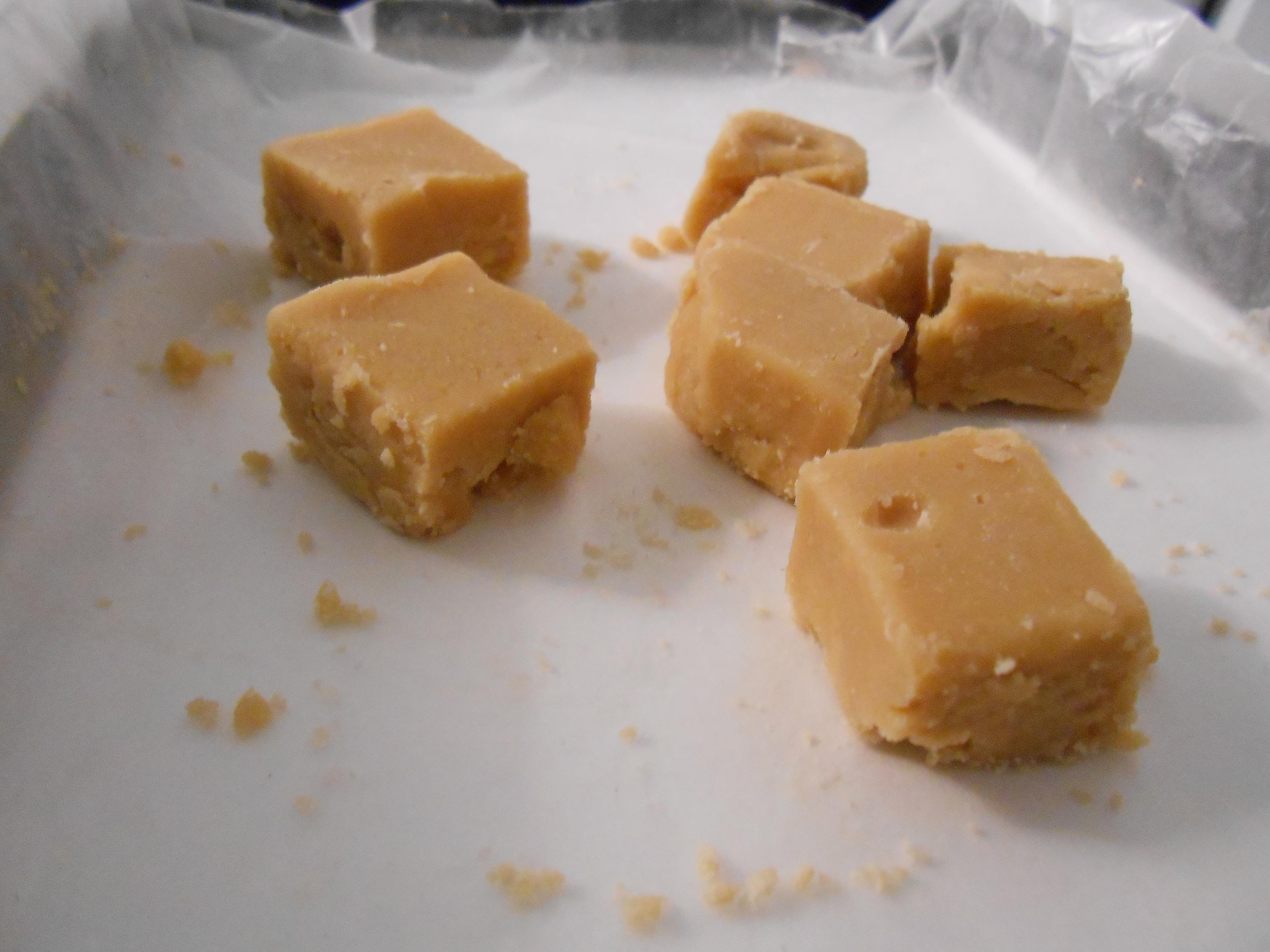
Sucre à la crème squares are eaten as a dessert or as a treat.

=== Drinks ===
- Bière d'épinette—spruce beer
- Ice cider -type of drink applying ice wine techniques to apples, invented in 1994 in Dunham by Christian Barthomeuf
- Caribou—drink made from red wine, a spirit and maple syrup

== Fast food ==
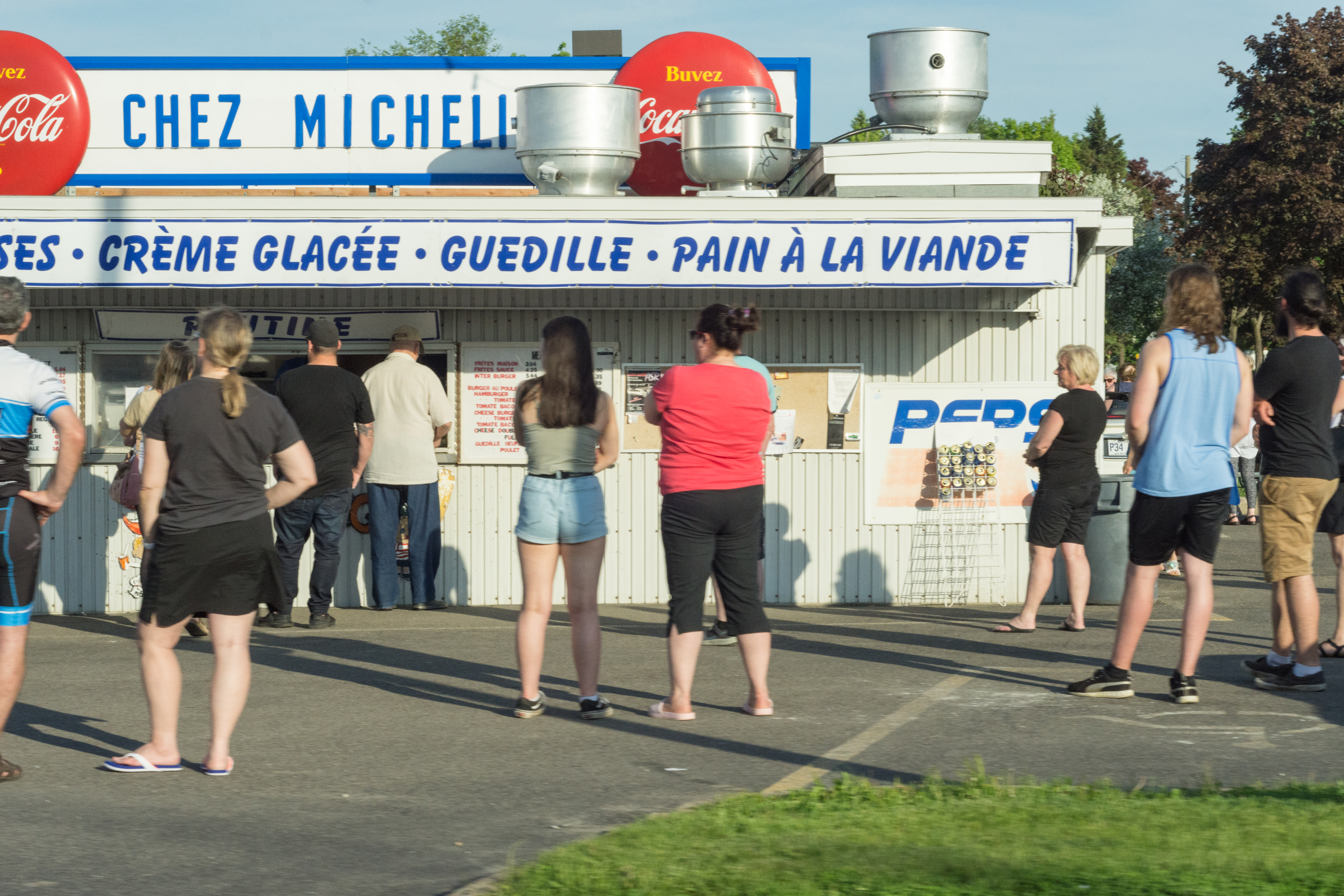
Casse-croûte Chez Micheline in Saint-Augustin-de-Desmaures.

The idea of fast food was quietly introduced to Quebec from the United States during the early 20th century. At first, it was sold from food trucks or carts pulled by horses who would park next to factories to sell quick cheap meals to factory workers. They were called "casse-croûtes" or "cantines" and run by local entrepreneurs. They would usually only sell a few items, like fries and hot-dogs. In 1940, there were around 200 of these mobile distributors around Montreal factories. Cantines as actual restaurants began to appear in the 1930s. These had wider menus serving fast food staples like hamburgers, hot-dogs, fries and club sandwiches, alongside some traditional meals like pea soup, pouding chômeur, etc.

Following the Second World War, the popularity of fast food grew enormously, aided by the rise of the automobile. The post-war years also saw the popularization of pizzerias serving American pizzas, chicken rotisseries, and breakfast restaurants serving English breakfasts.

Quebec's cuisine popularized certain techniques or foods that are not found or are uncommon in the rest of North America. For example, steamed hot dogs ("steamies") are popular in Quebec, and it is the norm to ask customers for their cooking preference. Steamies are usually topped with coleslaw, sweet yellow mustard, onion or sweet relish, but topping options can be more expansive. Another example is that the typical American industrial gravy is not used, instead brown gravy is favored, which is made from dehydrated chicken and beef along with spices, animal fat and vinegar. A lightly spiced chicken stock is also used and called "sauce barbecue". These were made to cover French fries (known as frite-sauce) and dishes such as hot chicken (chicken between two slices of bread covered with peas) or hot hamburger (an untopped hamburger covered with sauce and peas). Brown gravy also came to be used in Quebec's fast-food dish poutine when it was invented.

Casse-croutes are still very common today (in 2016, there were over 1400), but they now also compete with large chains from the US and native chains from Quebec like Valentine, La Belle Province, Ashton, Saint-Hubert, etc. Nowadays, foods usually served in Quebec fast-food establishments include: poutine and its variants, steamies, Michigan hot dog, pain à la viande (onions and ground meat on a hot-dog bun), frites-sauce, hot chicken, hot hamburger, hamburgers, pogos, onion rings, fries, coleslaw, spaghetti, caesar salad, pizza and its variants, the combination meals of pizza-ghetti and pizza-caesar, sandwiches, submarine sandwiches, club sandwiches, Montreal smoked meat sandwiches and platters, shawarmas and a Quebec variant called shish taouk, gyros and the Quebec exclusive souvlaki pita, roasted chicken, chicken fingers, lasagna, mac and cheese, grilled cheese, fish and chips, guedilles (lobster roll), cheese sticks, chicken wings, ice cream, and finally soft drinks.

=== Poutine variants ===
The classic Poutine is composed of fresh French fries and fresh cheese curds topped with hot brown gravy in a shallow bowl. The cheese curds are usually at room temperature to prevent them from melting and losing their elasticity or "squeakiness". Poutine emerged in the Centre-du-Québec area in the late 1950s. Its precise origins are uncertain as there are several cities and towns claiming to have invented the dish.

For many years, it was perceived negatively by English Canadians and mocked in English Canada.^{20} It was even used by some to stigmatize Québec society. But, it later became celebrated as a symbol of Québécois culture and the province of Quebec. It has long been associated with Quebec cuisine, and its rise in prominence has led to its popularity in the rest of Canada, in the northern United States, and internationally. Poutine has been called "Canada's national dish" which has sometimes been seen as cultural appropriation of a dish distinct to Quebec.^{20}^{16}

Because variants on the classic poutine have become widespread, many now consider poutine to be a dish class of its own. Some of the most commonly seen variants include: chicken poutine (chicken is added), hot dog poutine (hot dog is added), pulled pork poutine (pulled pork is added), smoked meat poutine (Montreal smoked meat is added), galvaude poutine (adds peas and turkey, and is associated with maritime Quebec), all-dressed poutine (adds ingredients to imitate an all-dressed pizza), "Italian" poutine (which replaces gravy with bolognese sauce), and lobster poutine (lobster is added and gravy is substituted). Menus who list variants on the classic poutine can vary wildly between restaurants. Establishments who specialise in poutines usually offer many variants and are called poutineries.

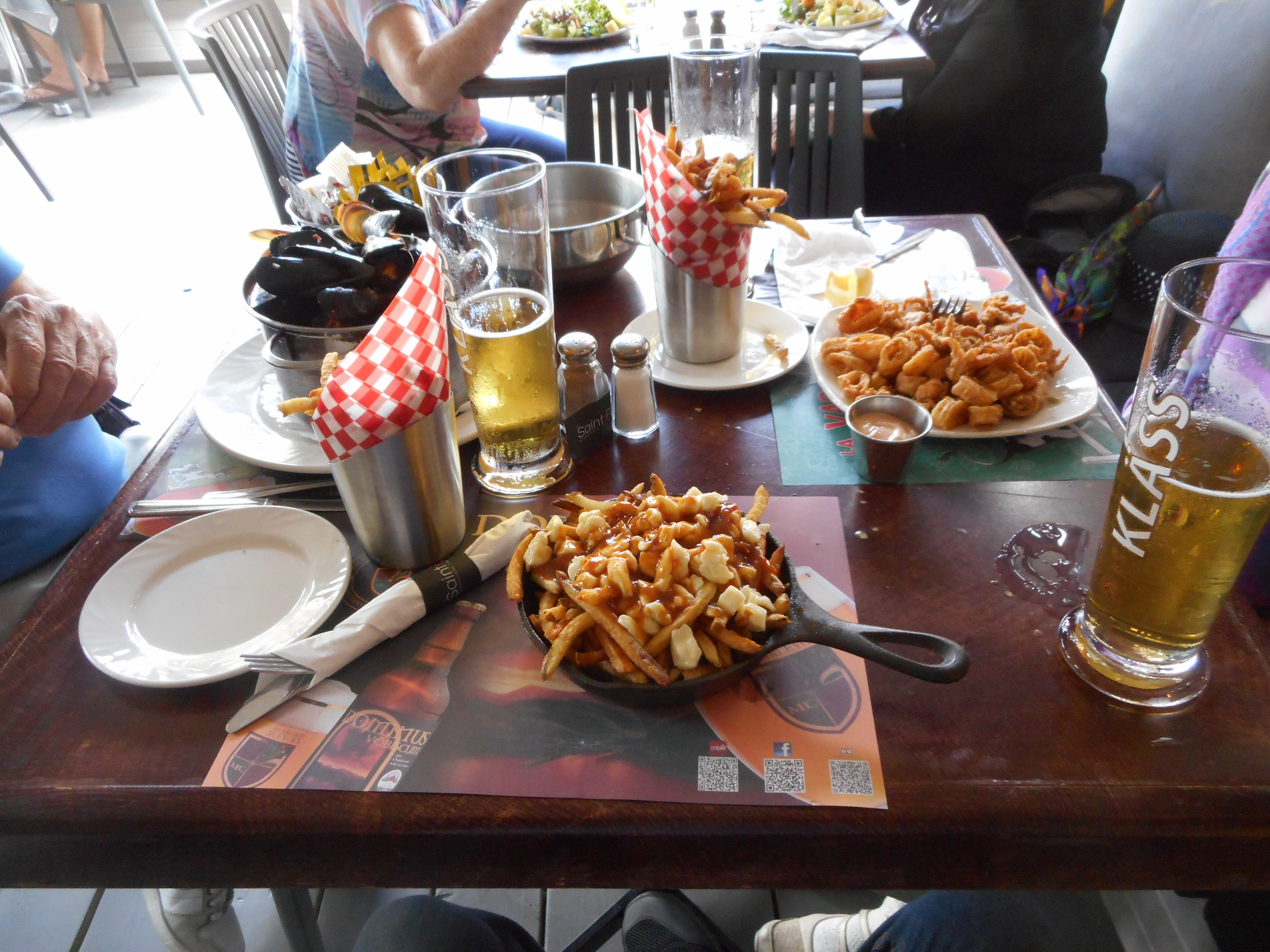
A classic poutine served in a cast-iron skillet.

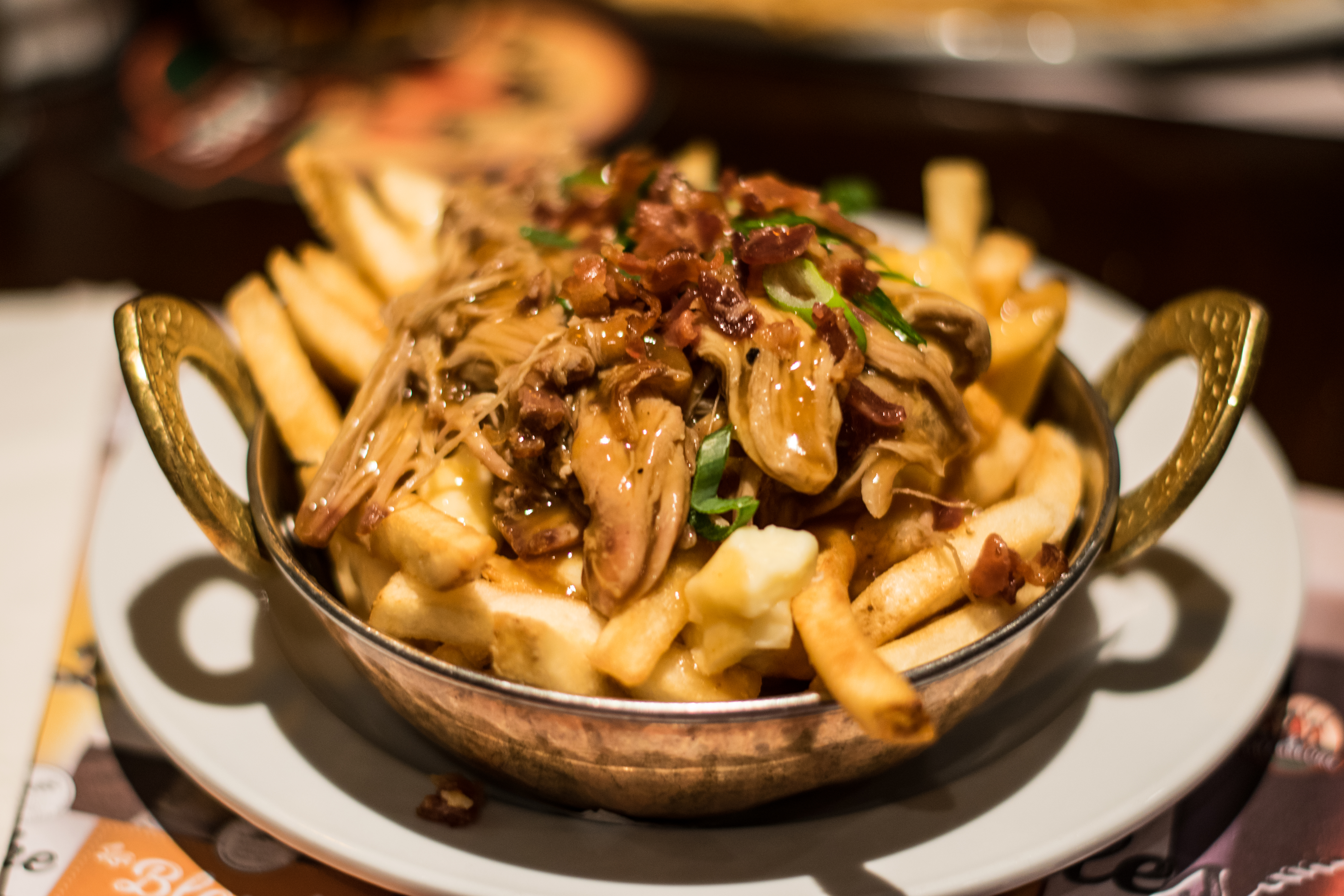
A pulled pork poutine.

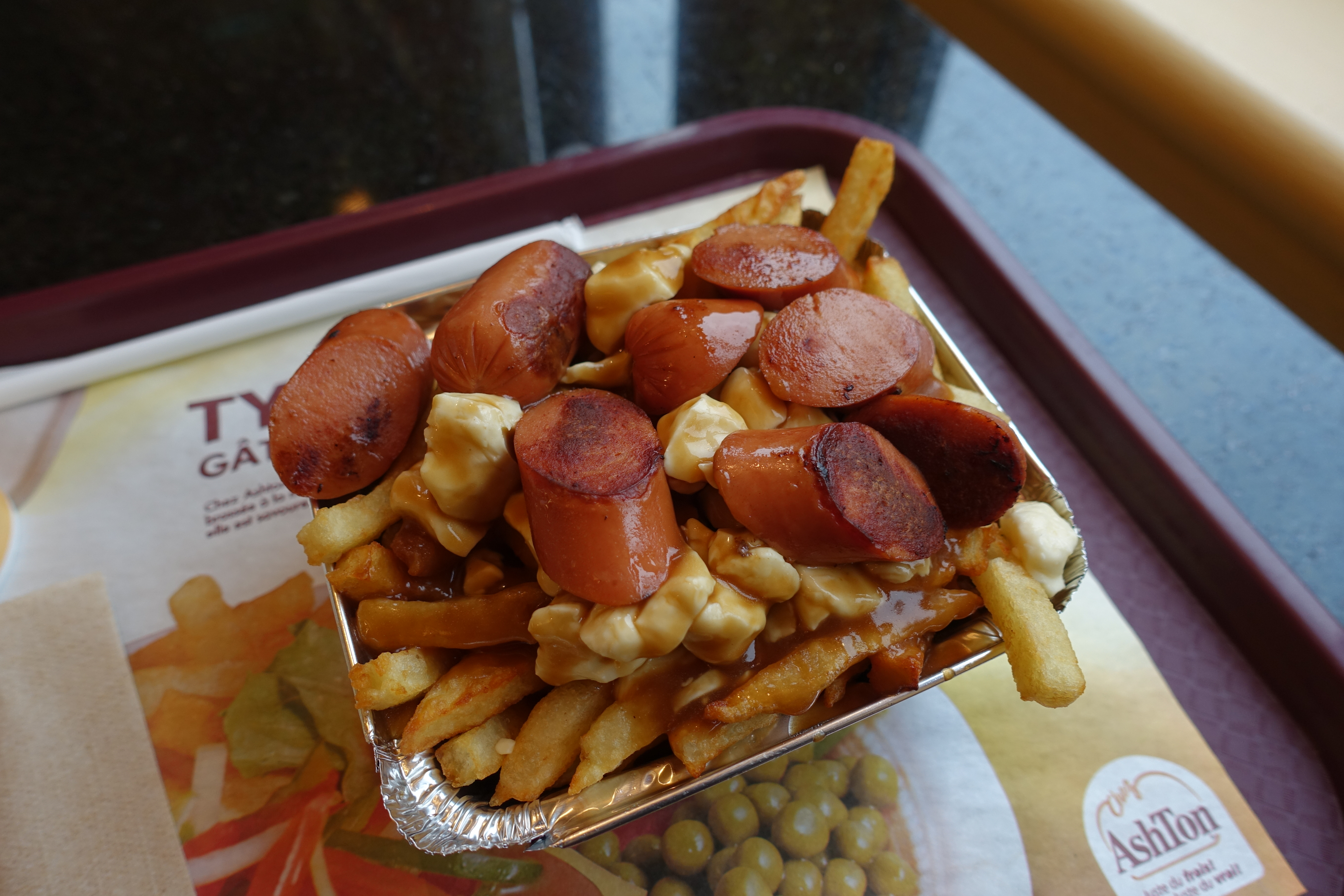
A hot dog poutine.

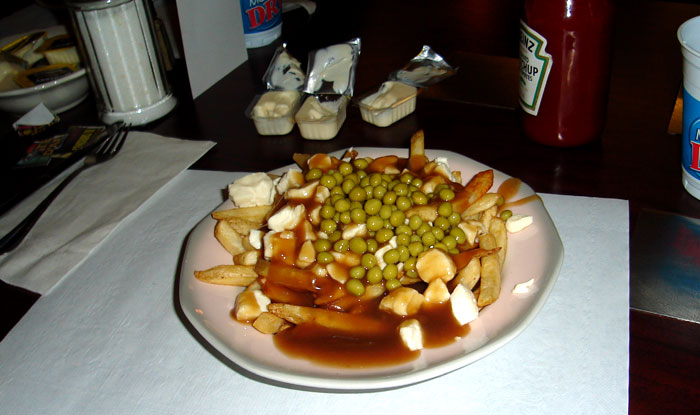
A galvaude poutine.

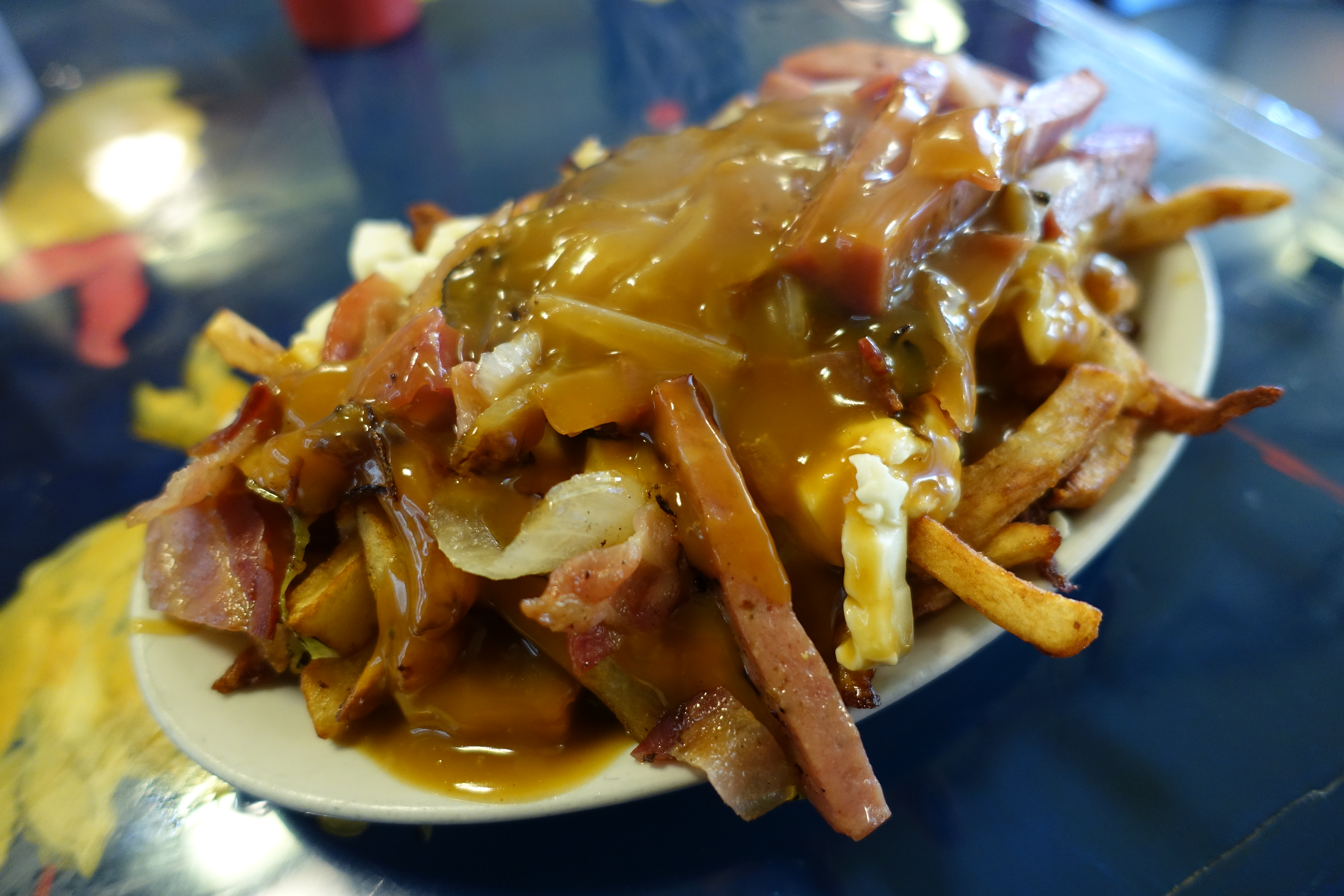
An all-dressed poutine.

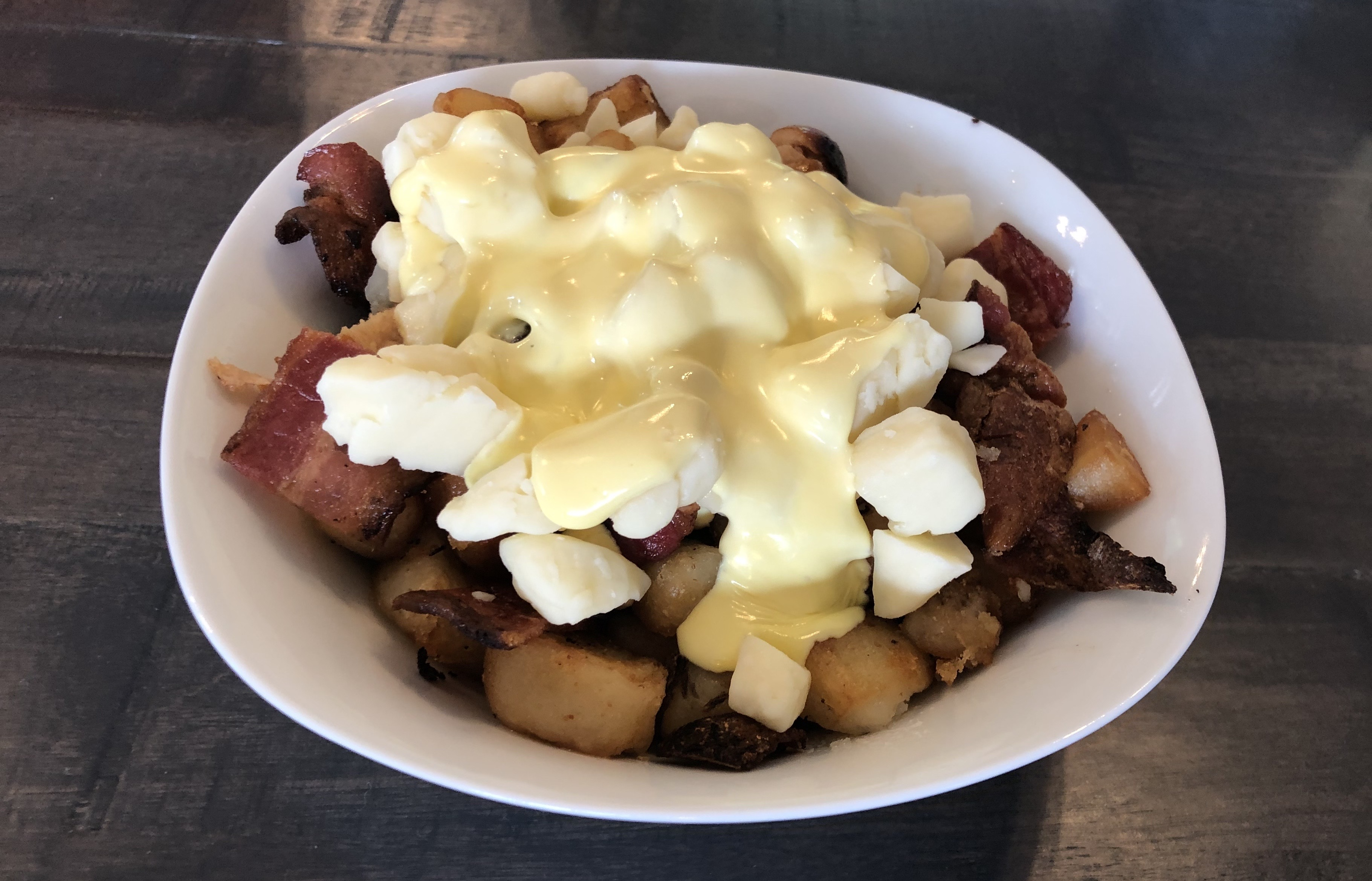
A breakfast poutine with hollandaise sauce and bacon.

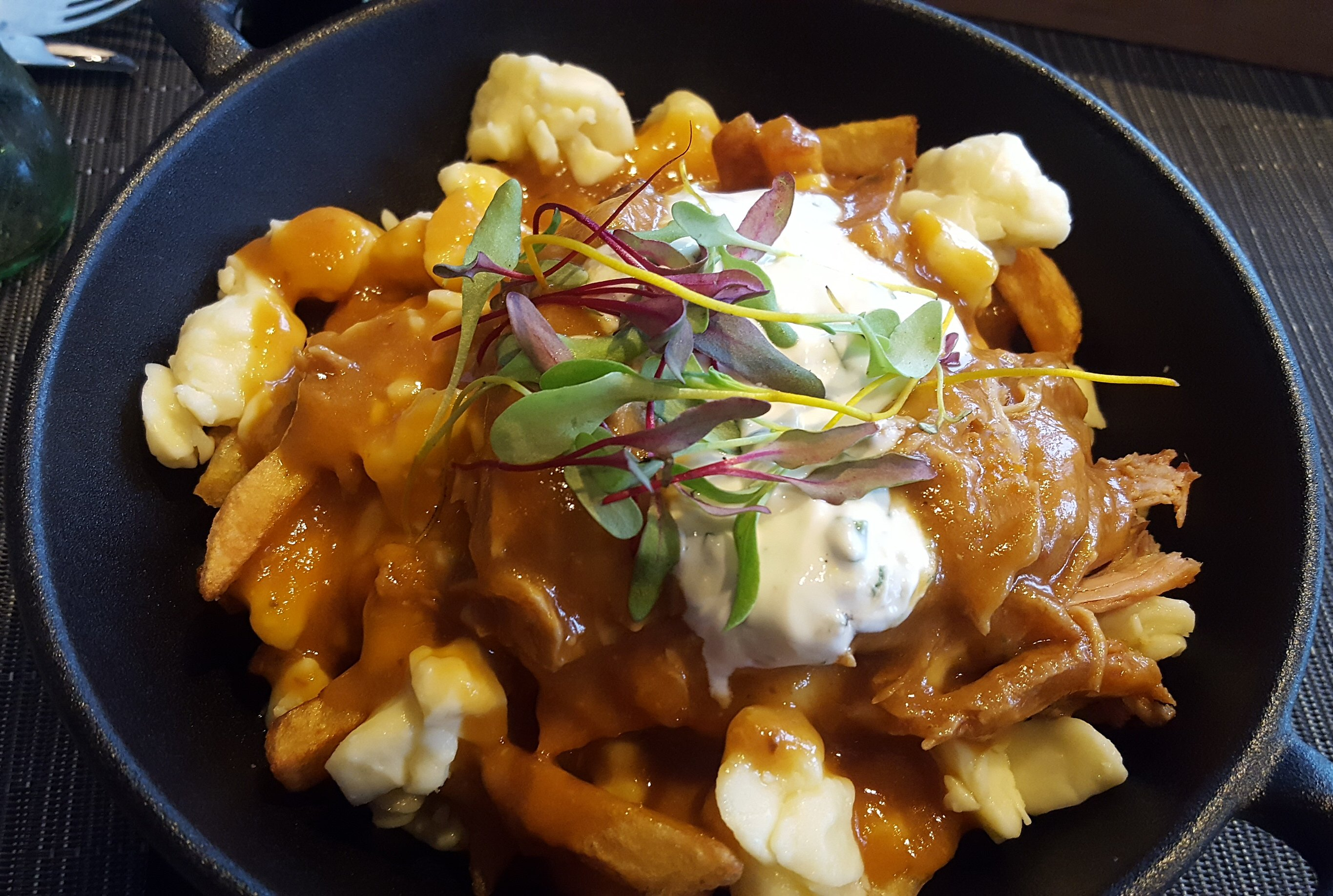
This poutine is named after Samuel de Champlain.

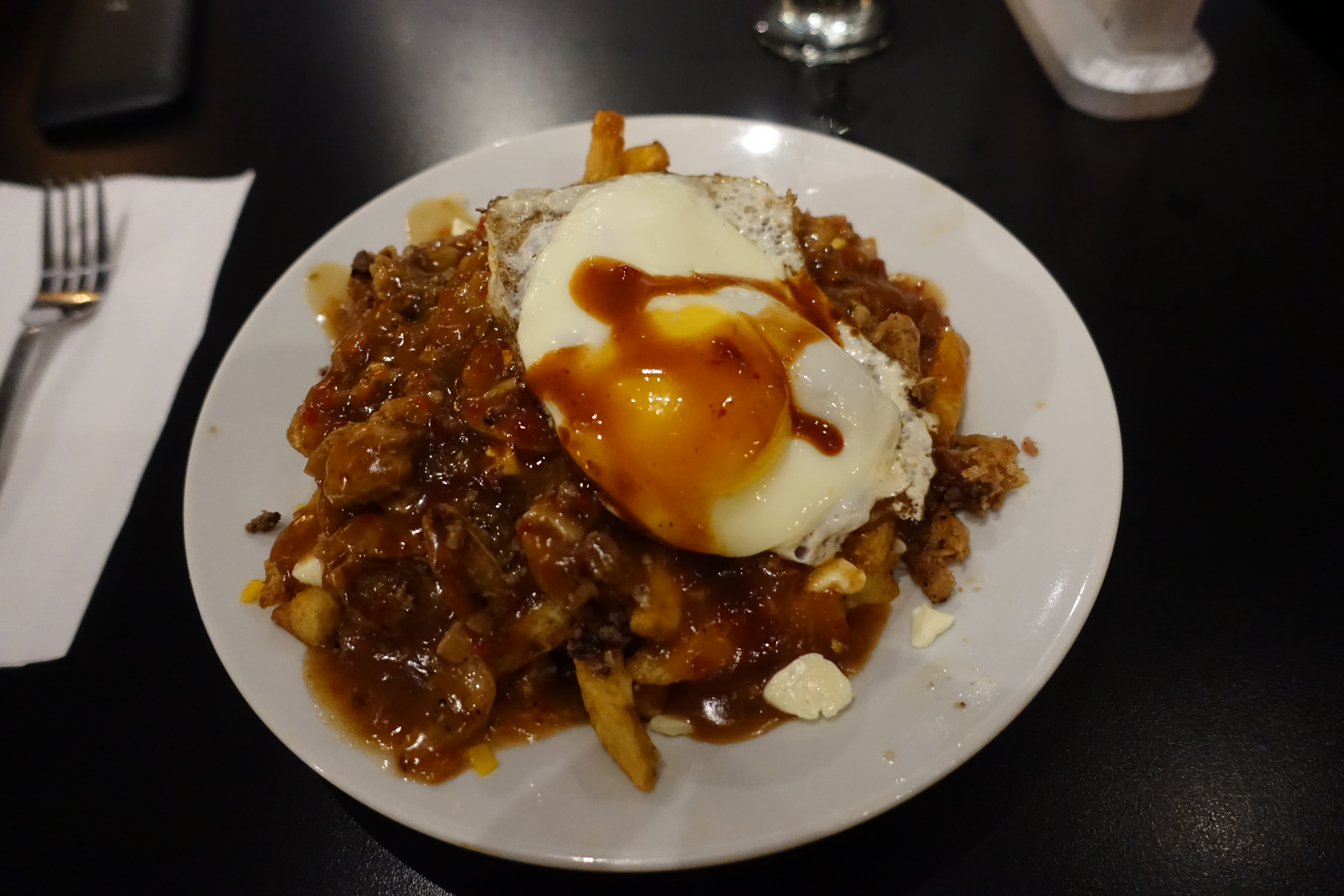
This poutine is sold as a cure to hangovers.

== Cheeses ==
When Canada was part of the French Empire, colonials used their Canadienne cattle to create a variety of soft, semi-soft and soft-ripened cheeses to eat. Following the Conquest of New France, the British began importing hard cheeses like Cheddar.^{15}

In the 1960s, the banning of raw milk made most of the old cheese-making techniques and recipes, which up to that point had been successfully passed on for centuries, disappear and become forgotten. Only a few recipes remain. The Saint-Pierre, produced on l'île d’Orléans, has the honour of being the oldest North American cheese. It is a soft-ripened cheese sold under the forms of la Faisselle, le Paillasson or le Raffiné. The Cailles cheese, a cheese made from fermented milk and typically used in salads, also used to be quite widespread. It now only exists in the Charlevoix and Saguenay-Lac-Saint-Jean regions. Nowadays, there are attempts to diversify the ways in which Cailles is consumed.

Towards the end of the 19th century, a group of trappist monks were expelled from France and moved to Oka. One of them, who originated from Notre-Dame-du-Port-du-Salut, created a paste which was eventually used to mold the first Oka cheese. Benedictines were responsible for creating l’Ermite, a blue cheese, in 1943 at Saint-Benoît-du-Lac.

Today, Quebec creates over 700 different kinds of cheeses and is the biggest cheese producer in Canada. People enjoy many natively produced and imported hard cheeses, including hard cheeses flavored with beer or wine. Most soft cheeses are produced locally and many are artisanal.

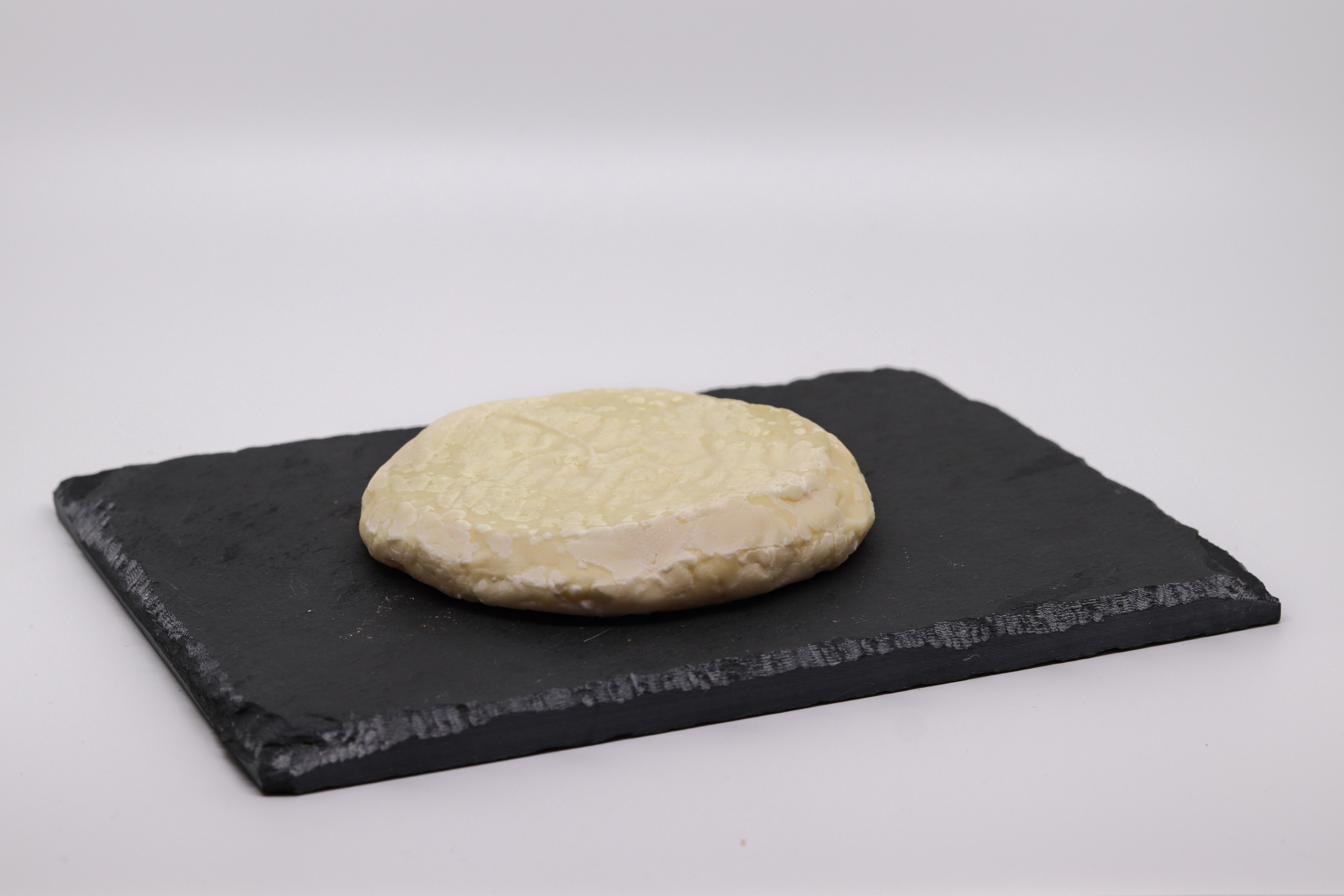
The Paillasson. It is eaten grilled and is often paired with maple syrup.

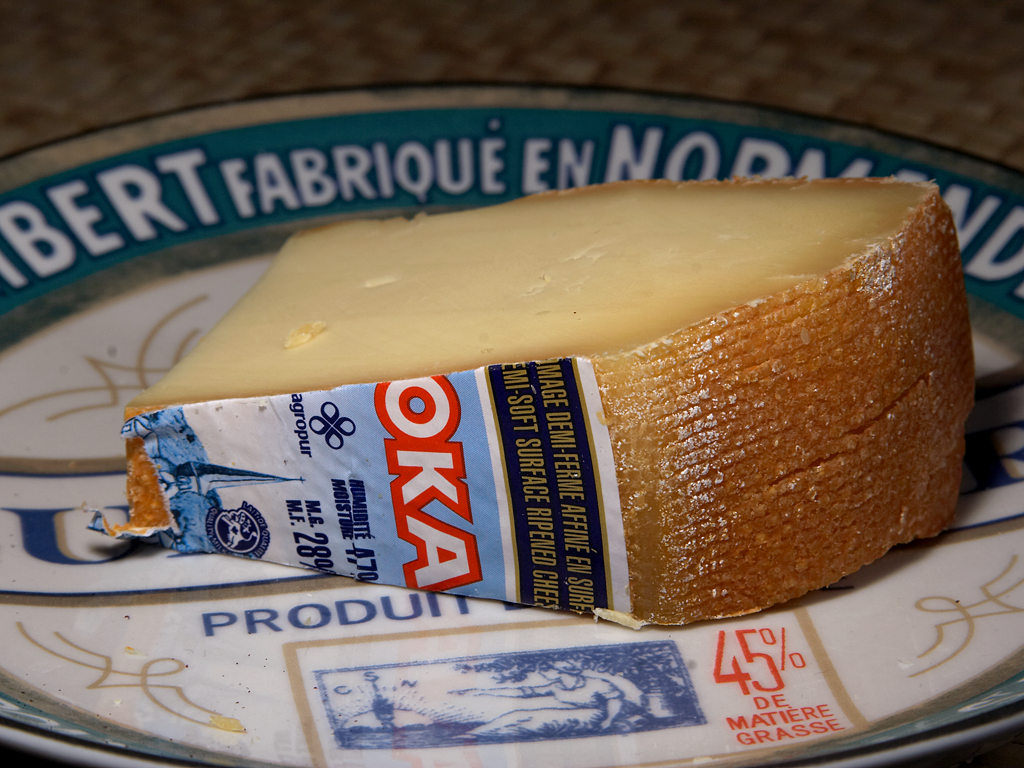
Oka cheese is now made in large factories.

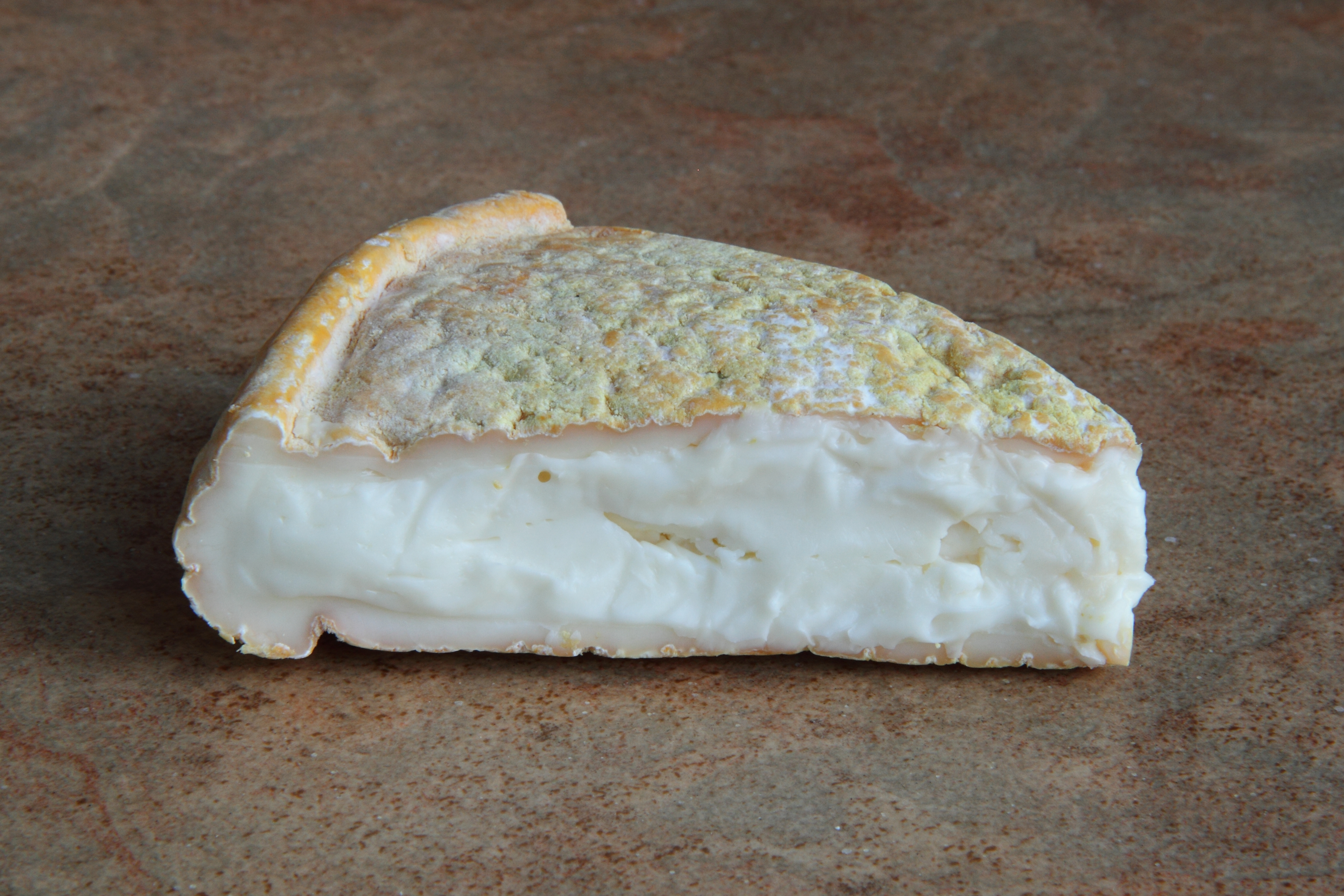
Pied-De-Vent cheese is made from the milk of Canadienne cattle.

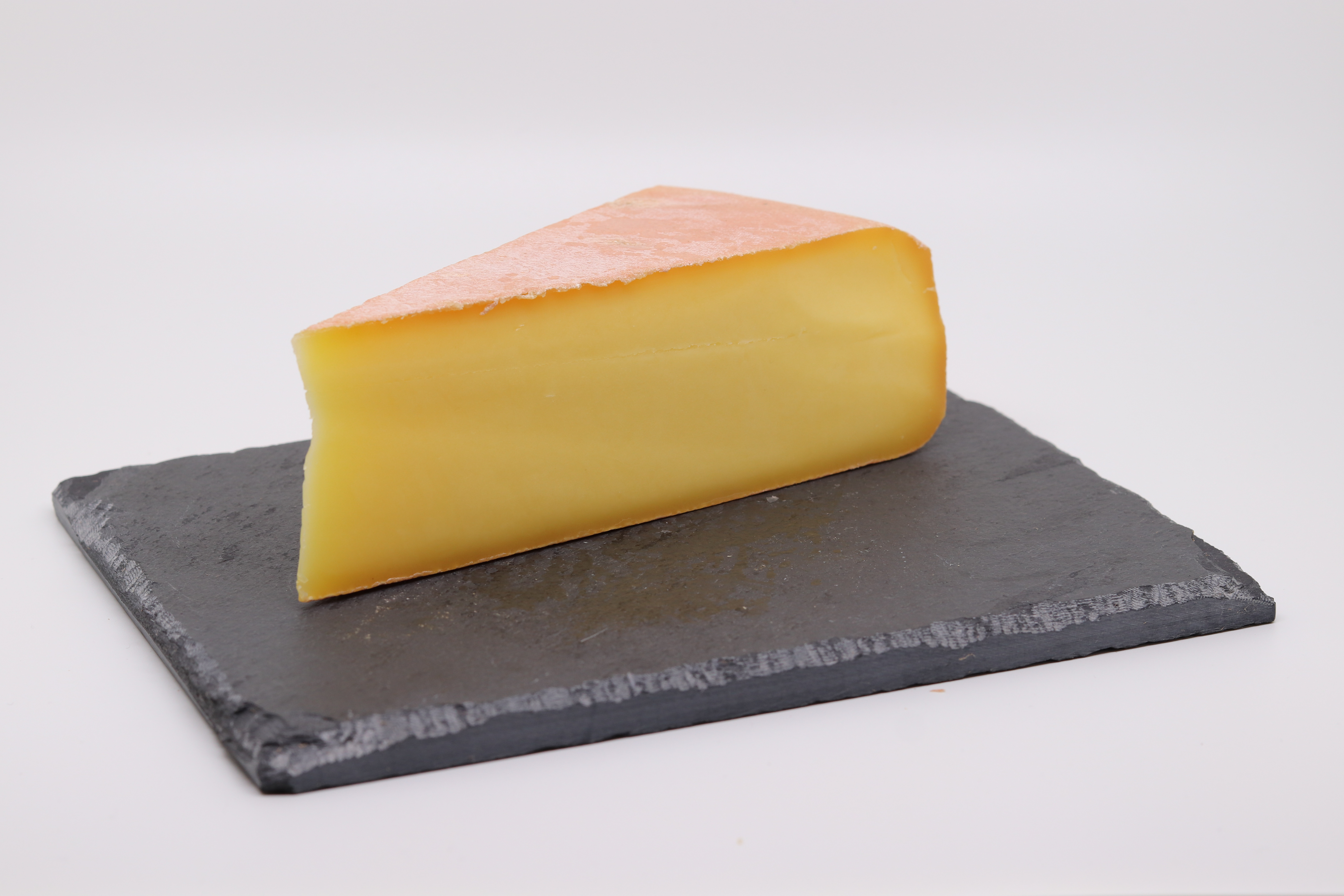
The Pikauba was created in 2005 in Hébertville.

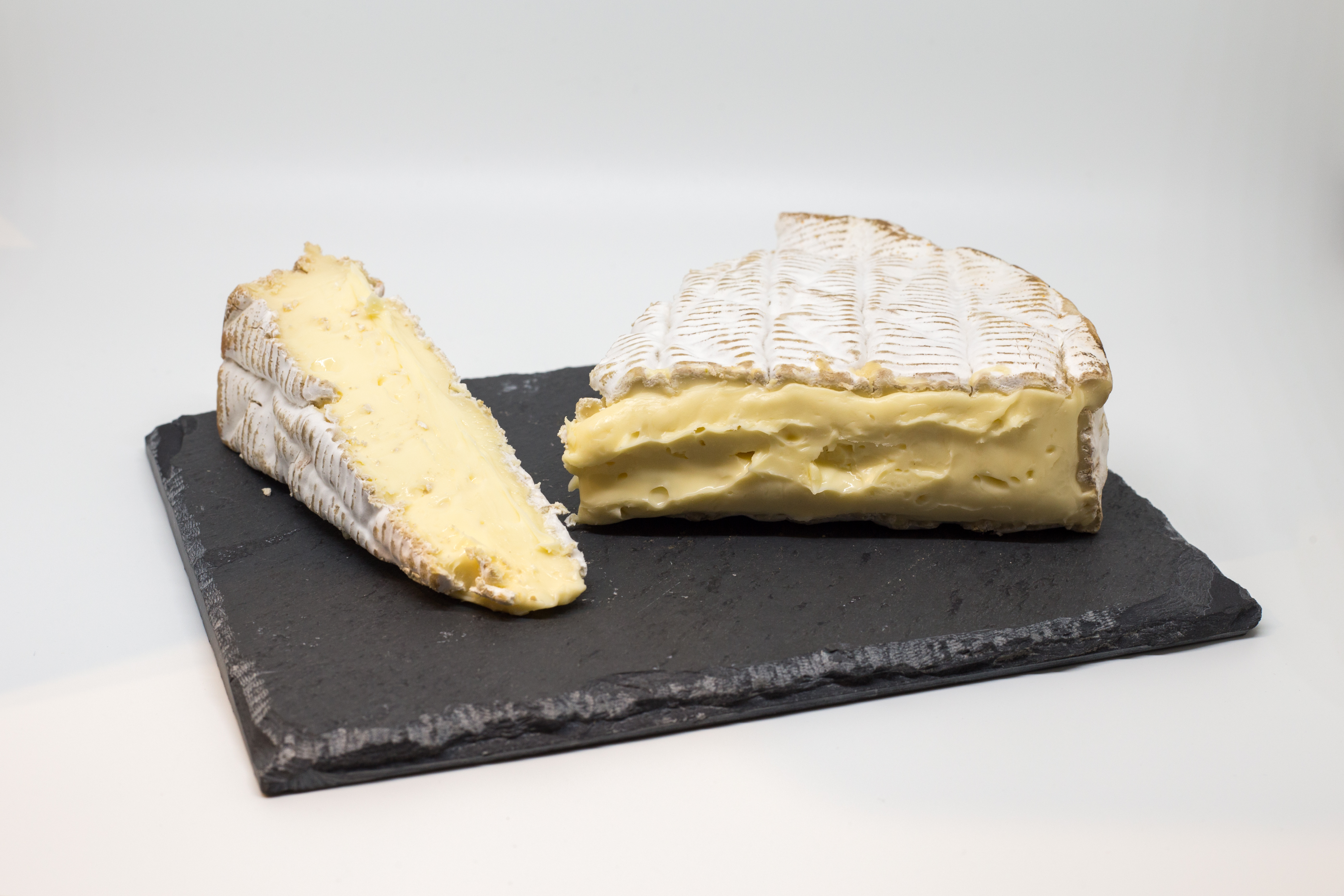
Le Riopelle de l'Isle is a triple-cream cheese named after Jean-Paul Riopelle.

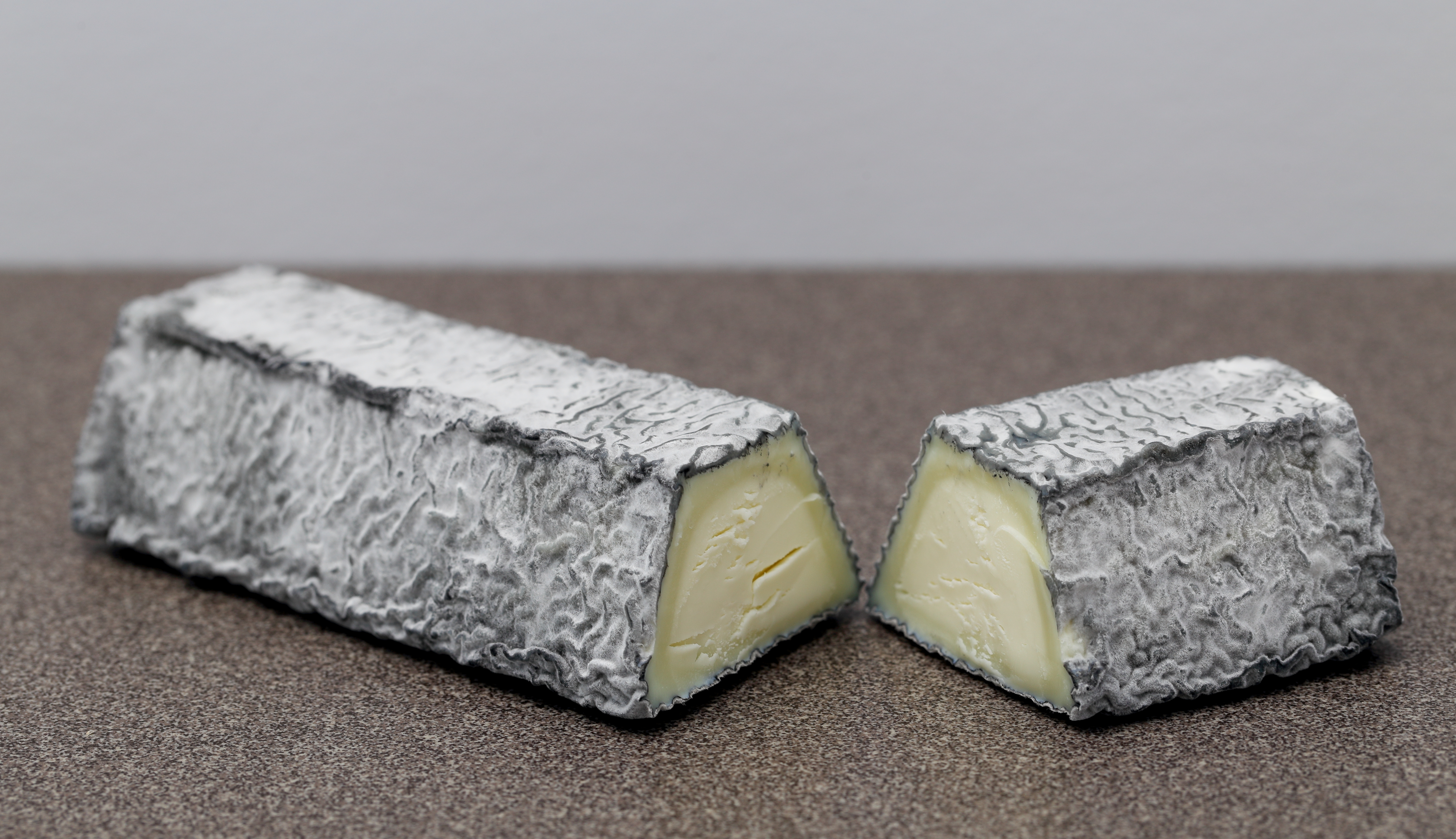
The Cendrillon won Best cheese in the world in the 2009 World Cheese Awards.

== Maple syrup ==
Quebec produces 72% of the maple syrup sold on Earth and 90% of the maple syrup sold in Canada. Maple syrup is made from heated maple sap. The syrup is often used at breakfast to cover crêpes and pain doré, and as a component of fèves au lard. It can also be used to caramelize meats like ham, to stabilize the acidity of certain sauces, and to complement desserts. It is the main ingredient showcased in sugar shacks.^{16}

Many maple syrup-derived products exist. Tire, French for sugar on snow, is heated maple syrup that is cast onto a flat bed of snow and then rolled up onto a Popsicle stick. Tire is very popular at sugar shacks and during springtime. Maple butter is a spread commonly used at breakfast on toast. Maple sugar can serve as a replacement to brown and white sugar.

== Meat ==
=== Smoked meat ===
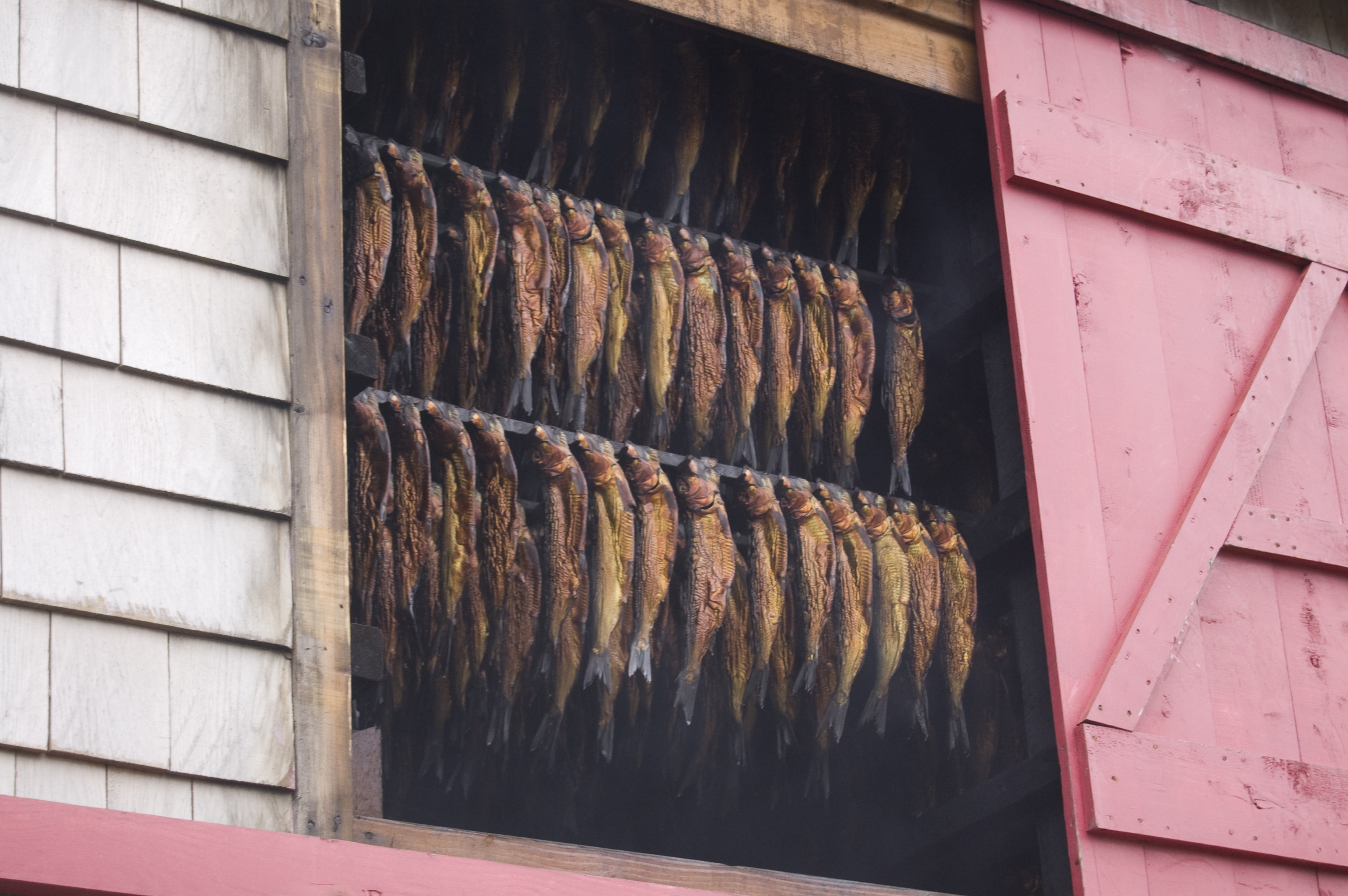
Atlantic herring undergoing boucanage.

In Quebec, a technique called boucanage is sometimes used to smoke meat.

Colonials learned this technique from First Peoples. After they discovered that it was useful for preserving food, they decided to start smoking their meat in the boucanage fashion, following their usual brining or spicing. First Peoples, on the other hand, continued to only boucaner and never started brining or spicing.^{11} Today, Quebecers still eat food that has been boucané for its taste.

Establishments called boucanières or boucaneries are specialized in the process. Modern boucanières can also use tree essences to infuse a certain taste in the meat, with maple wood being the most popular choice. A technique called boucaner à froid has also been developed; it involves drying fish and then suspending them over a fire.^{15} Boucaner à froid has always been popular in Gaspesie, Bas-Saint-Laurent and Côte-Nord regions since fish were and are still commonly caught there.

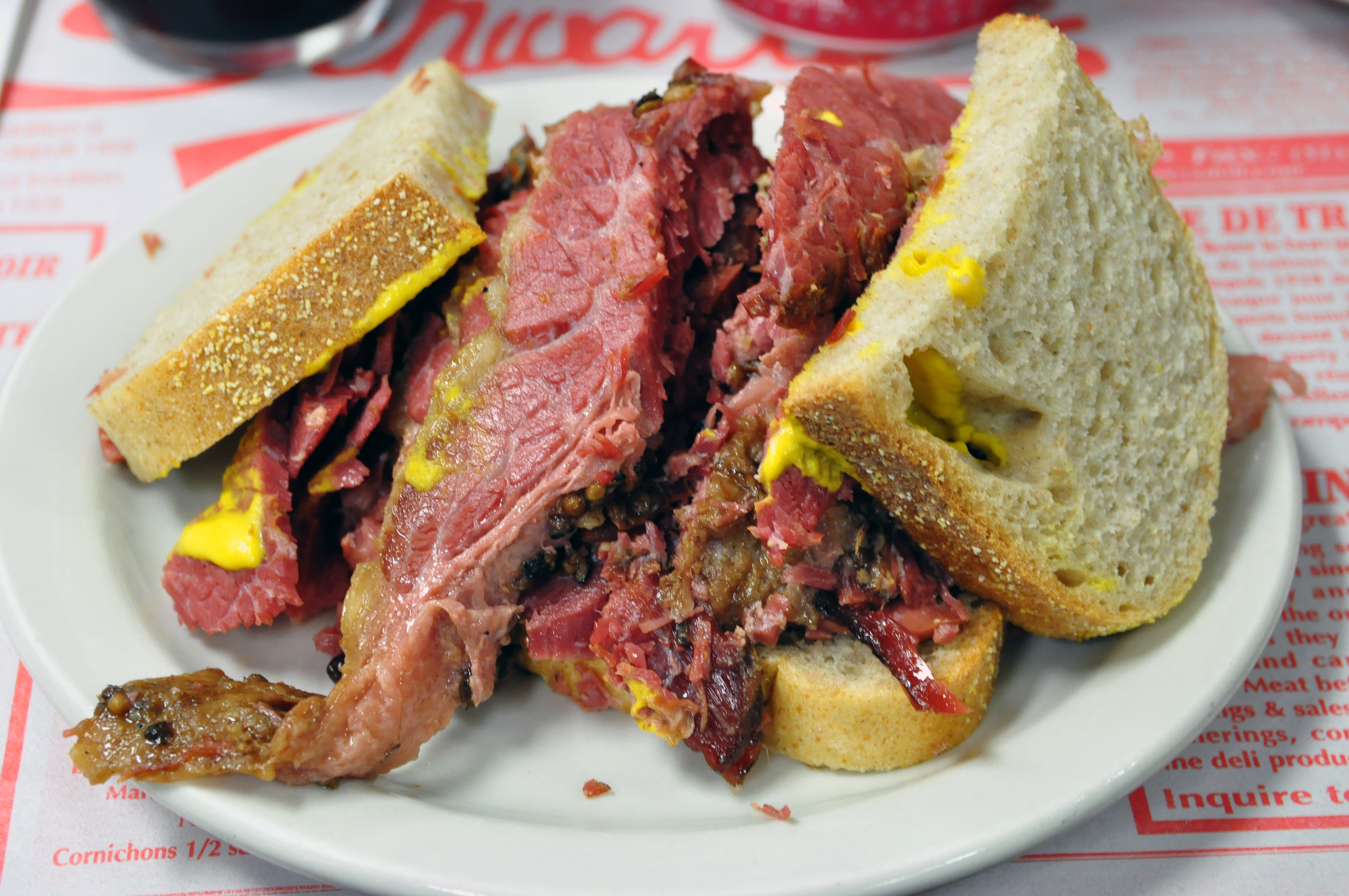
A Montréal smoked meat sandwich.

In the early 20th century, Jewish immigrants came to Montreal and introduced their own Eastern European meat-smoking technique to Quebec. This technique is often used today to make Montreal smoked meat, which is then often cut up in narrow slices to be added to dishes as an ingredient. Montreal smoked meat is also often spiced with Montreal steak seasoning and used to make Montreal smoked meat sandwiches.^{17}

Smoked salmon has become more popular in recent decades due to influence from the United States and Europe. Smoked pork's popularity has decreased^{11} and it is now almost exclusively consumed during Easter.^{18}

=== Charcuterie ===
In Quebec, charcuterie is sometimes referred to as cochonailles. It includes:

- Creton is composed of ground pork, lard, milk and cereal that is cooked together to obtain a creamy paste. Cretons are often eaten as a snack or for breakfast on roasted bread pieces called rôties. If another kind of meat is used to create cretons, like poultry or veal, it is called cretonnade instead.
- Tête fromagée is less popular but used in the same way as cretons.
- The boudin of Quebec is made of lard, milk, onions and pork blood. It is served in a pan along with a sweet side or a sauce. Since 2018, the Goûte-Boudin de Boucherville association hands out a yearly prize for the best boudin.
- Plorines are composed of lard and flavoured meat enveloped in pork caul fat. Sometimes plorine recipes can also include eggs, beef or bread.
- Oreilles de Christ are lard pieces that are fried until crispy. They are eaten as an amuse-gueule and sometimes with maple syrup.

== Microbreweries ==
Quebec was the first province in Canada to foster microbreweries, the first being Le Cheval Blanc in 1986, and today the province holds over 330. Quebec's microbrewery scene is particularly noteworthy for its names revolving around French Canadian wordplay, tying to folklore, or regional pride. Moreso than in other provinces, Quebec microbreweries utilize local and foraged ingredients, due to the popularity of ingredients from the terroir and storytelling. Examples of such ingredients are not limited to: maple syrup or sap, spruce tips, wild mushrooms, flowers, rhubarb, wild herbs and spices, locally grown and wild berries (including berries like cloudberries, serviceberries, etc.), pumpkin, farmhouse yeast, wood aging, and more...

== Pastries ==
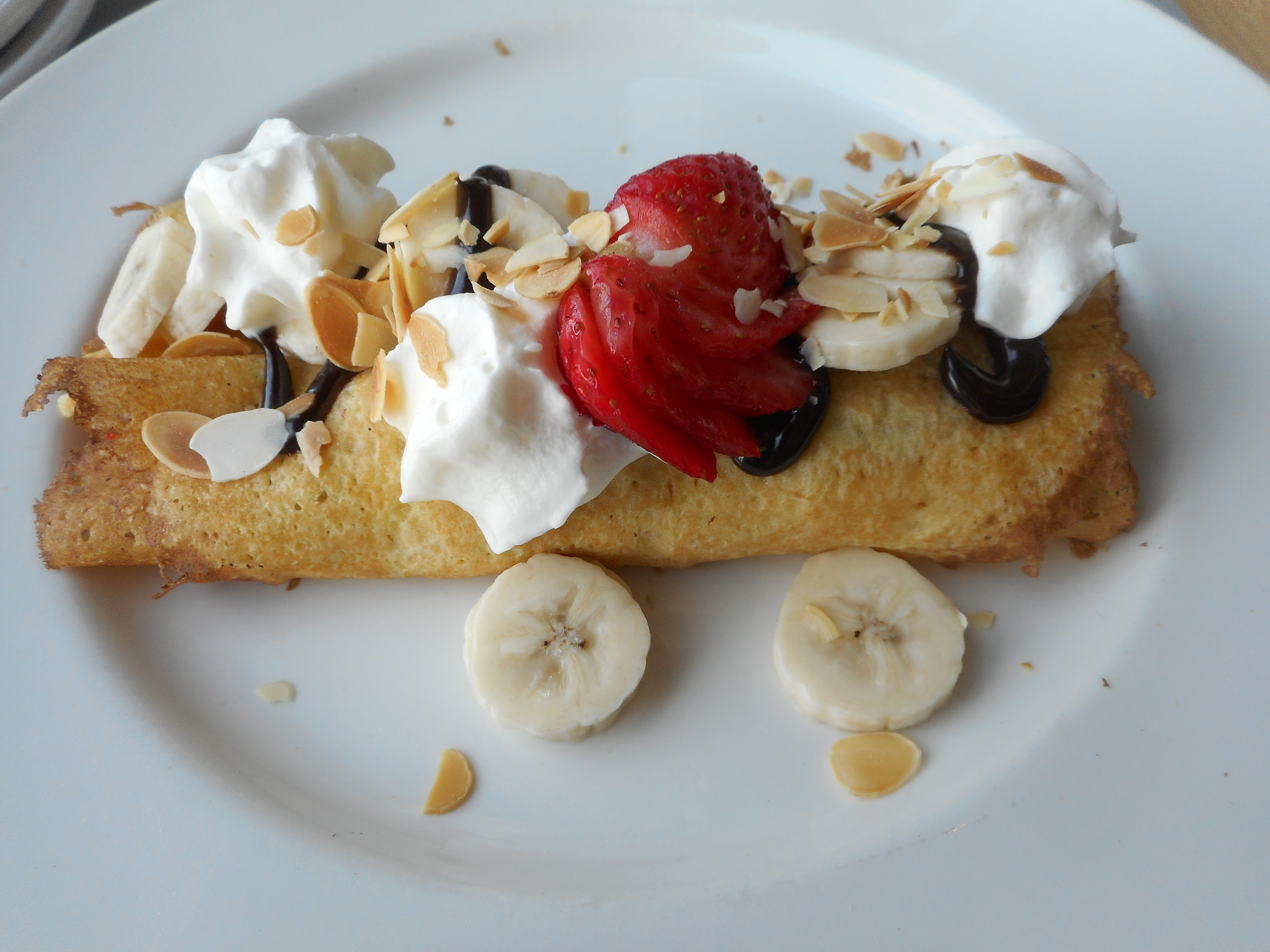
A crêpe with fruits and chocolate.

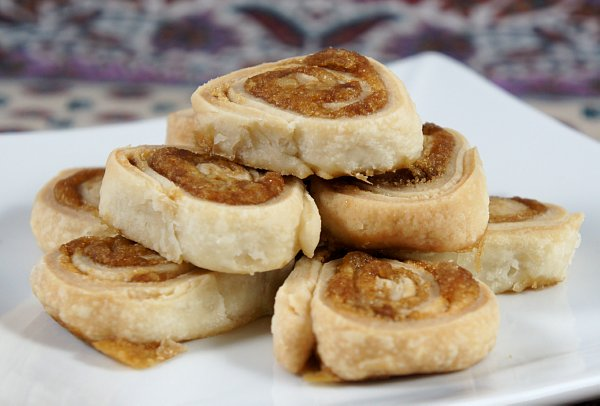
A tower of pets-de-sœurs

Here are some pastries popular in Quebec:

- Crêpes and pancakes are popular breakfast items. They are often served with maple syrup or fruits.^{5}
- Doughnuts. The doughnut holes are eaten as well with powdered sugar or icing on top.
- Pies. The most popular kinds are sugar-based, like tarte au sucre, or fruit-based, like blueberry, apple, strawberry, or raspberry.
- Cakes. Popular kinds include carrot cake and chocolate cake.
- Sucre à la crème is a fudge-like sweet.
- Pets-de-sœur and cinnamon rolls are both popular and spiral-shaped.
- Chocolatines consist of small croissants with chocolate inside.
- Pouding chômeur is a white cake soaked in maple syrup or brown sugar.
- Grands-pères, a spherical cake that is eaten plain, with maple syrup, or filled with fruits.^{5}
- Éclairs, an oblong pastry stuffed with cream and topped with chocolate.
- Macarons are a sandwich-shaped meringue-based sweet.
- Mille-feuilles are a layered puff pastry.
- Croquignoles are braided, twisted or rectangular fried dough pastries. They may be found in rural regions.^{11}

== Regional foods ==
Some regions of Quebec are known for specific foods or products. Montréal is known for having created Montreal-style smoked meat, Montreal-style bagels, Montreal hot dogs (also called "steamies"), and Montreal melons. The Saguenay-Lac-Saint-Jean region is the birthplace of the tourtière du Lac-Saint-Jean, soupe aux gourganes and Saguenay Dry.

Maritime Quebec, known for its fish and seafood, is a region where cipaille is consumed during the holidays. Pot-en-pot des îles de la Madeleine is a dish of the Magdellan Islands.

Some municipalities are associated with high-quality meat, such as duck from lake Brome or Charlevoix lamb.

== Strains and breeds ==
=== Strains ===
Over the centuries, new strains of fruits and vegetables have been created in Quebec. Then, in the 1900s, people moved away from a farming lifestyle. As a result, most of these have been lost. Here are some that have been preserved or rediscovered:

- The Montreal melon
- The Oka melon
- White Canadian corn
- The crotte-d’ours potato of Louis-Marie
- The Thibodeau bean of Saint-Jules
- The pomme Fameuse
- The Mémé tomato of Beauce
- The potato onion

=== Breeds ===
Though few in number now, these breeds are still used today:

- Canadienne cattle
- Chantecler chicken
