= Ermite =

Canadian cheese

- Country of origin: Canada
- Region: Estrie, Quebec
- Town: Saint-Benoît-du-Lac, Quebec
- Source of milk: Cow
- Pasteurised: yes
- Texture: creamy/sticky
- Fat content: 27%
- Protein content: 11g (per 50g)
- Aging time: 60 days
- Certification: -

L'Ermite cheese was the first cheese created at the Saint Benoit Abbey in 1943. Ermite is a blue cheese.

== See also ==
- List of cheeses
