= St. Catherine's taffy =

French-Canadian taffy

St. Catherine's taffy (French: tire de Sainte-Catherine) is a variety of taffy made by French-Canadian families to celebrate the feast day of Saint Catherine of Alexandria, which takes place annually on November 25.

== Origins ==
St. Catherine's taffy is a candy made by girls in French-Canadian families to honour St. Catherine, the patron saint of unmarried women, on her feast day, November 25. Saint Catherine's Day is sometimes known in Franco-Canadian families as "taffy day", a day when marriage-age girls would make taffy for eligible boys. Marguerite Bourgeoys, a founder of the Notre-Dame de Montréal and an early teacher at Ville-Marie, the colonial settlement that later became Montreal, is credited with starting the tradition as a way of keeping the attention of her young students.

== See also ==
- Catherinette
