= List of Canadian inventions, innovations, and discoveries =

Canadian inventions and discoveries are objects, processes, or techniques—invented, innovated, or discovered—that owe their existence either partially or entirely to a person born in Canada, a citizen of Canada, or a company or organization based in Canada. Some of these inventions were funded by National Research Council Canada (NRCC), which has been an important factor in innovation and technological advancement. Often, things discovered for the first time are also called inventions and in many cases, there is no clear line between the two.

The following is a list of inventions, innovations or discoveries known or generally recognized to be Canadian.

== Inventions and improvements ==
Notable Canadian inventions and improvements to existing technologies include:

=== Agriculture, food and beverage ===
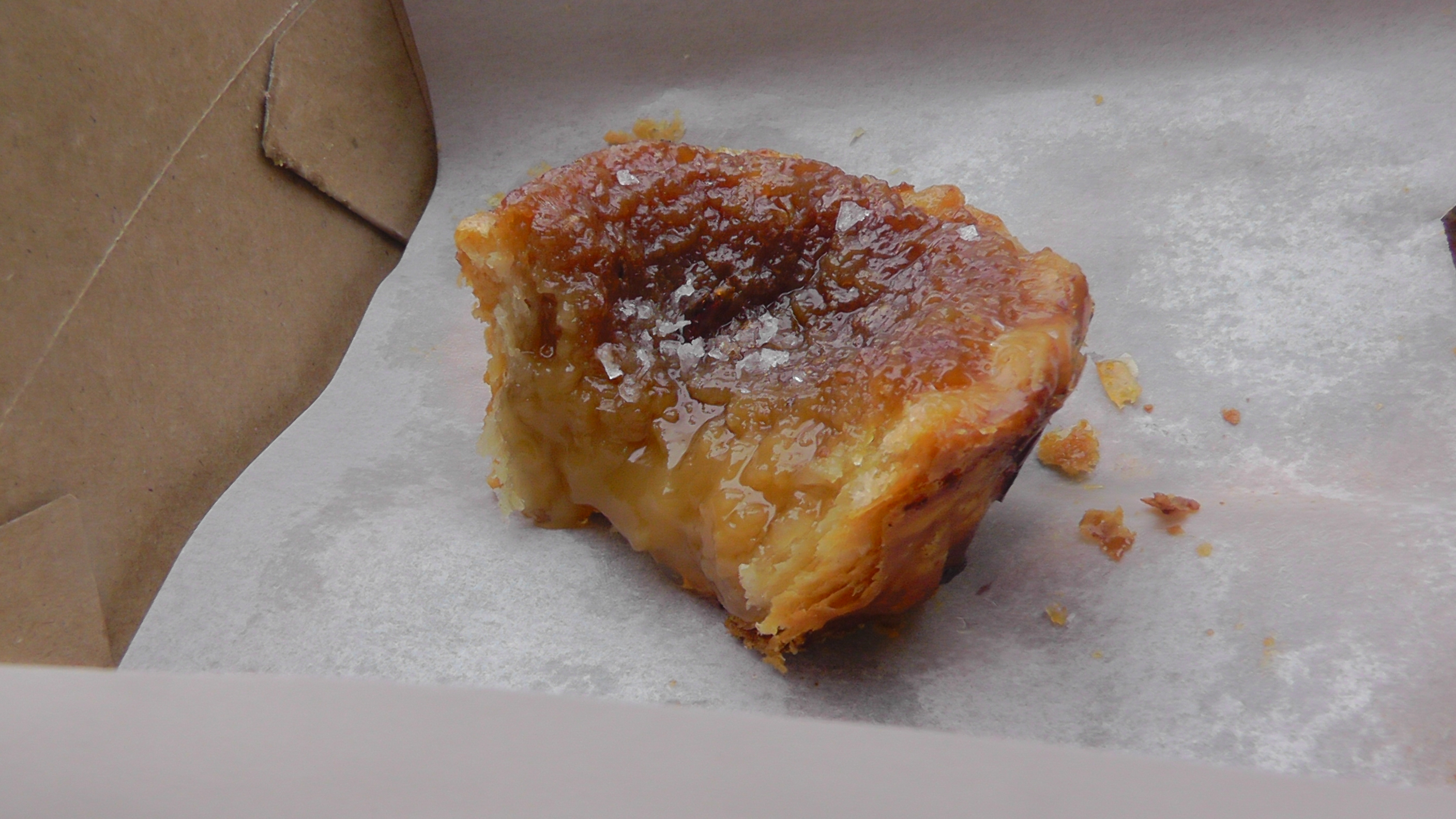
A plain butter tart, cut to show the insides

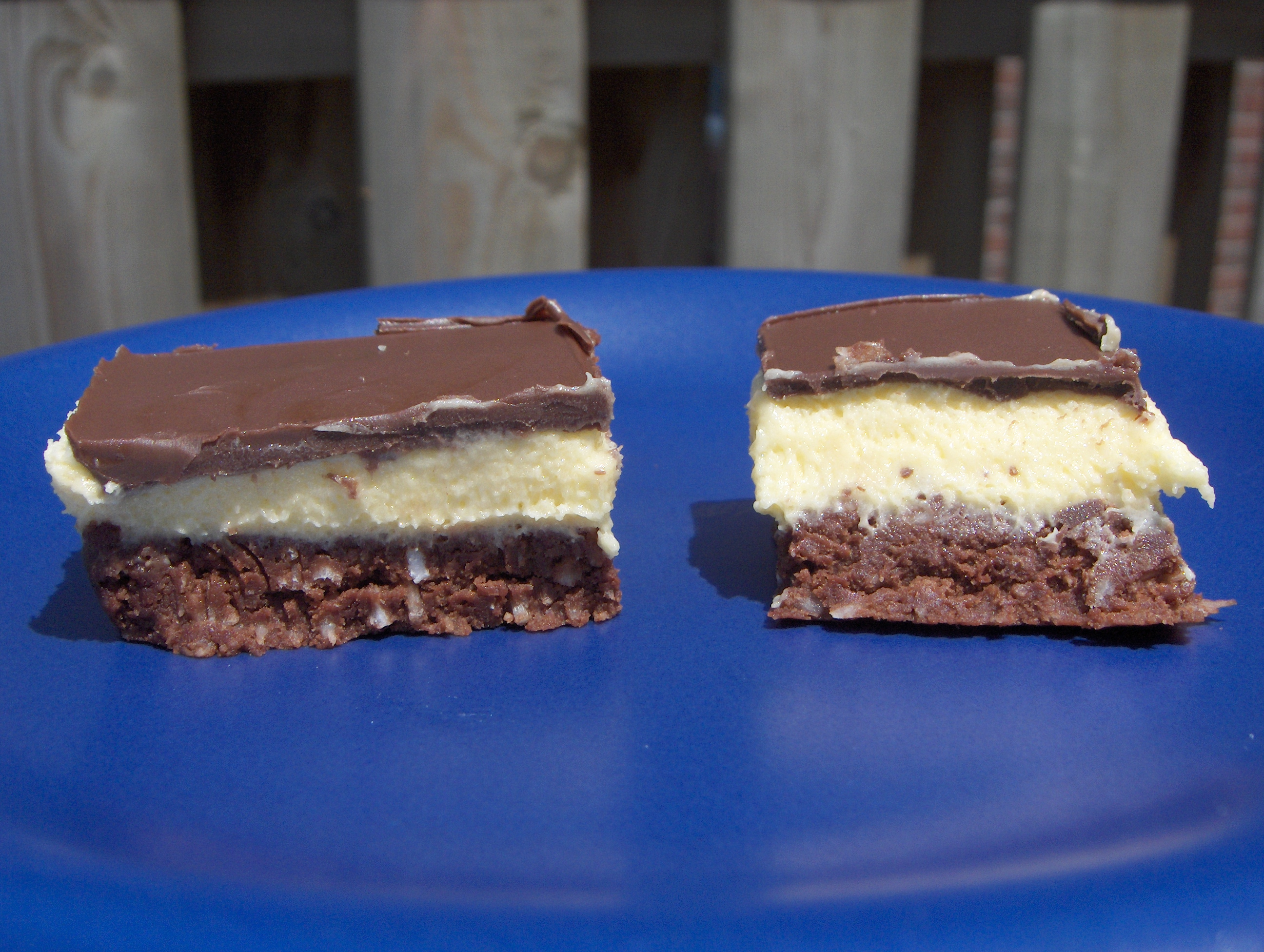
Nanaimo bar

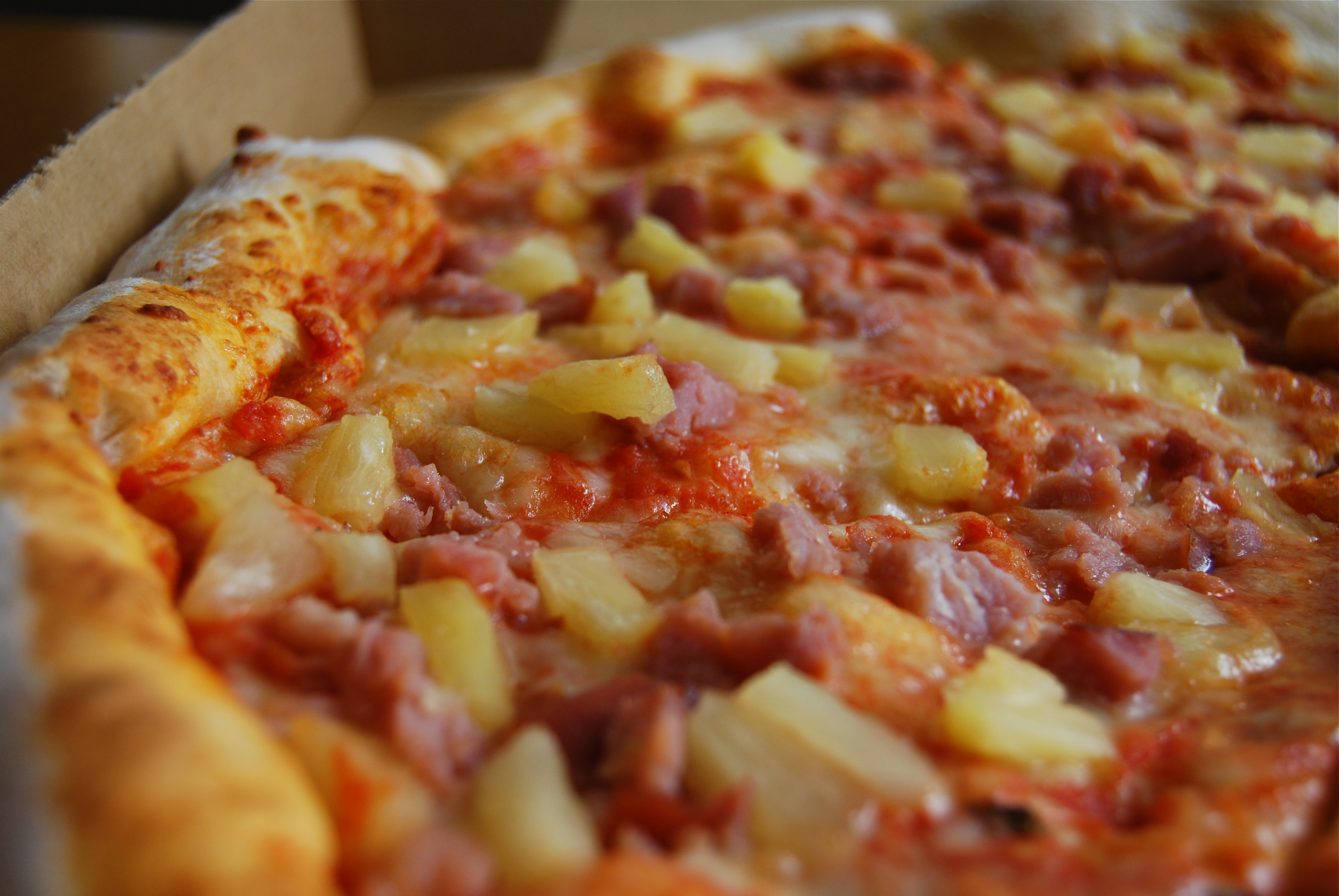
Hawaiian pizza
- Ambrosia apple – first cultivated in British Columbia during the early 1990s.
- B.C. roll – a type of sushi invented in Vancouver in 1974 by chef Hidekazu Tojo.
- Beaver tails and touton – fried dough pastry that is sold in a variety of flavours.
- Butter tart – a filling of butter, sugar, syrup, and egg, baked in a pastry shell.
- Caesar (cocktail) – invented by Walter Chell in Calgary in 1969.
- California roll – a sushi roll with the seaweed wrapped on the inside of the rice, said to be created by the Japanese-Canadian chef living in Vancouver, Hidekazu Tojo, in 1974, although there are competing claims.
- Canada Dry Ginger Ale – a dry ginger ale invented by John J. McLaughlin in 1904 under the name of "Pale Ginger Ale", before it was patented in 1907 under "Canada Dry Ginger Ale".
- Canasnack – Space food in the shape of oatmeal cookies developed by the Canadian Space Agency.
- Canola Oil – developed from natural rapeseed (a plant from the turnip family) by National Research Council Canada (NRCC) personnel in the 1970s, containing a low-erucic acid content.
- Cheezies – a brand of cheese puff snack food made and sold in Canada by W. T. Hawkins Ltd.
- Cipaille – a Quebec adaptation of sea-pie without seafood.
- Coffee Crisp – a chocolate bar invented by British company Rowntree in Canada.
- Crispy Crunch – created by Harold Oswin in 1930.
- Donair – a regional variation of the doner kebab, using beef instead of lamb. Invented in Halifax, Nova Scotia around 1970 by Peter Gamoulakos.
- Fricot – a traditional stew consisting of clams, chicken and other meats.
- Garlic fingers – an Atlantic Canadian dish, similar to a pizza in shape and size and made with the same type of dough.
- Ginger beef – is a Canadian Chinese dish made from beef, ginger, and a distinctive sweet sauce.
- Hawaiian pizza – invented by the Greek-Canadian cook and businessman Sam Panopoulos, in 1962.
- Instant mashed potatoes (dehydrated potato flakes) – invented by Edward Asselbergs in 1962.
- Jubilee apple – developed by Pacific Agri-Food Research Centre in British Columbia.
- London Fog – a hot tea-based drink that consists of Earl Grey tea, steamed milk, and vanilla syrup.
- Maple leaf cream cookie – maple leaf-shaped cookie with maple cream filling.
- Maple taffy – a sugar candy made by boiling maple sap.
- Marquis wheat – invented by Charles E. Saunders in 1908 and tested at the Agassiz experimental farm in British Columbia. (c. 1900), developed from Red Fife wheat.
- McIntosh apple – developed by John McIntosh in Upper Canada in 1811
- Montreal melon – originally cultivated in the Montreal area but lost due to industrialization. The melon's seeds have recently been rediscovered and its cultivation revitalized.
- Nanaimo bar – a dessert bar that requires no baking, invented in Nanaimo around 1953.
- Pablum – infant cereal, invented by Frederick Tisdall, Theodore Drake, and Allan Brown in 1930.
- Peanut butter – Canadian chemist Marcellus Gilmore Edson patented a way to make "peanut paste", also known as peanut butter in 1884.
- Pizza Pops – a calzone-type snack produced by Pillsbury.
- Poutine – created in the Centre-du-Québec region in the 1950s.
- Ragoût de boulettes (Meatball Stew) – traditional Canadian comfort food from Quebec.
- Ragoût de Pattes de Cochon (Stewed Pig's Feet) – French-Canadian stew with leg or feet, originating in Quebec.
- Red Fife wheat – a Canadian landrace descendant of Western Ukrainian (Galicia) wheat, first grown by David Fife in Upper Canada in 1842.
- Spartan apple – an apple similar to the McIntosh introduced to Summerland, British Columbia in 1936, developed by R. C. Palmer.
- Tourtière – a French Canadian meat pie common during holidays, invented in the early 1600's, with the first recipe in 1840.
- Yukon Gold potato – invented by Gary Johnston in 1966.

=== Computing, film, and animation ===
IMAX format

- Archie (search engine) – the first internet search engine, invented by Alan Emtage at McGill University around 1988.
- Film colorization – invented by Wilson Markle in 1983.
- Four Line Conics – An experimental mathematics film directed by Trevor Fletcher, produced by the National Film Board of Canada in 1961
- IMAX movie system – co-invented by Graeme Ferguson, Roman Kroitor, and Robert Kerr in 1968, following the creation of what is now the IMAX Corporation.
- Java programming language – invented by James Gosling in 1994.
- Key frame animation – co-invented by Nestor Burtnyk and Marcelli Wein at the NRC in the 1970s.
- Multi-dynamic image technique – invented by Christopher Chapman in 1967.
- Trackball – first built for the DATAR computer (although the concept was first mentioned in a similar project in the United Kingdom).

=== Communications ===
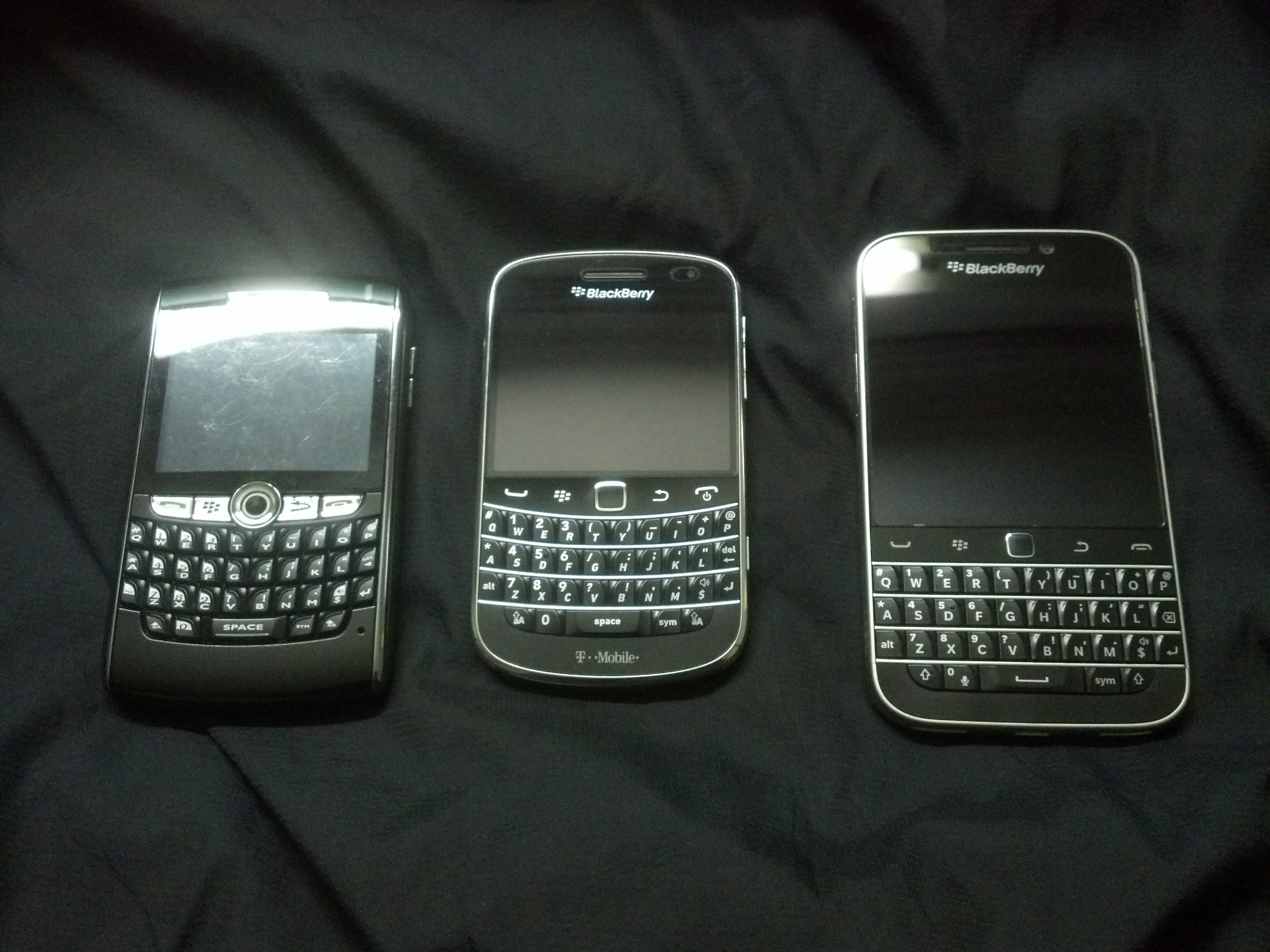
Three Blackberry phones

- 56k modem – invented by Dr. Brent Townshend in 1996
- 735 kV power line – the international standard for long-distance electricity transmission, invented by Jean-Jacques Archambault in Quebec, where the world's first 735,000-volt line was commissioned in 1965
- AM broadcasting – invented by Reginald Fessenden in 1906
- Amplitude modulation – invented by Reginald Fessenden in 1906
- BlackBerry device – its development was led by Mike Lazaridis, who founded BlackBerry Limited
- Cesium Beam atomic clock – developed by National Research Council personnel in the 1960s
- Computerized braille – invented by Roland Galarneau in 1972
- Creed teleprinter system – invented by Frederick G. Creed in 1900
- Fathometer – an early form of sonar invented by Reginald Fessenden in 1919
- Gramophone – co-invented by Alexander Graham Bell in 1889

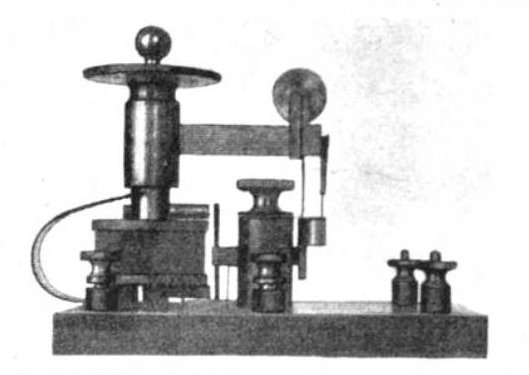
Fessenden barretter

- Hot-wire barretter – invented by Reginald Fessenden in 1902
- Newsprint and pulped-wood paper – invented by Charles Fenerty in 1838
- Pager – invented by Irving "Al" Gross in 1949
- Quartz clock – built by Warren Marrison in 1927
- Radiotelephony – first demonstrated by Reginald Fessenden in 1901
- Standard time – introduced by Scottish-Canadian Sandford Fleming in 1878
- Telephone – invented by Alexander Graham Bell in 1876
- Telephone handset – invented by Cyrille Duquet in 1878
- Undersea telegraph cable – invented by British-Canadian Frederic Newton Gisborne in 1857
- Walkie-talkie – invented by Donald Hings and Irving "Al" Gross in 1942 for military use

=== Climate-related ===
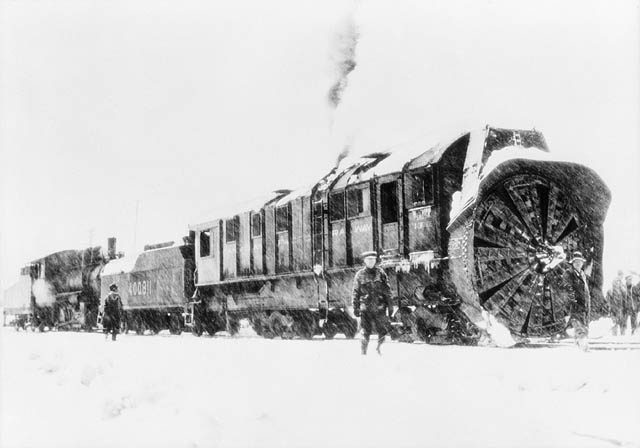
Rotary snowplow

- Rotary snowplow – invented by Canadian dentist J.W. Elliot in 1869, and perfected by Orange Jull of Orangeville, Ontario
- Snow blower – invented by Arthur Sicard (1927)
- Steam-powered foghorn – invented by Robert Foulis (1859)

=== Defence ===
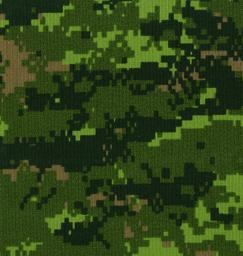
CADPAT digital camouflage pattern

- ASDIC – invented by Robert William Boyle in 1916
- Canadian pipe mine – a land mine used in Britain in World War II
- Beartrap (hauldown device) – invented for the Royal Canadian Navy in the early 1960s to assist helicopter landings onboard ships
- CADPAT – the first digital camouflage system, which was then used for the United States MARPAT (1996)
- G-suit (or anti-gravity suit) – a suit for high-altitude jet pilots invented by Wilbur R. Franks in 1941
- Defendo – a Canadian martial art
- Gunstock war club – an indigenous weapon used by many First Nations in Canada
- Gas mask – the first widely used military gas mask was introduced by Cluny Macpherson in 1915
- Sonar – invented by Reginald Fessenden
- Stealth snowmobile – in 2011 the Canadian Armed Forces announced the development by Canadian-based company CrossChasm Technologies
- Tomahawk – traditional Canadian war instrument created by the Algonquian peoples

=== Domestic life and fashion ===
- Alkaline battery – invented by Lewis Urry in 1954
- Amauti – an Inuit woman's parka from Canada's eastern Arctic used to carry (pack) children
- Bi-pin connector – invented by Reginald Fessenden in 1893
- Bottle return programs — programs where alcoholic bottles are returned from consumers in exchange for money
- Capote – worn by the inhabitants of New France to protect from the harsh winters
- Ceinture fléchée – one of many pieces of Canadian clothing listed

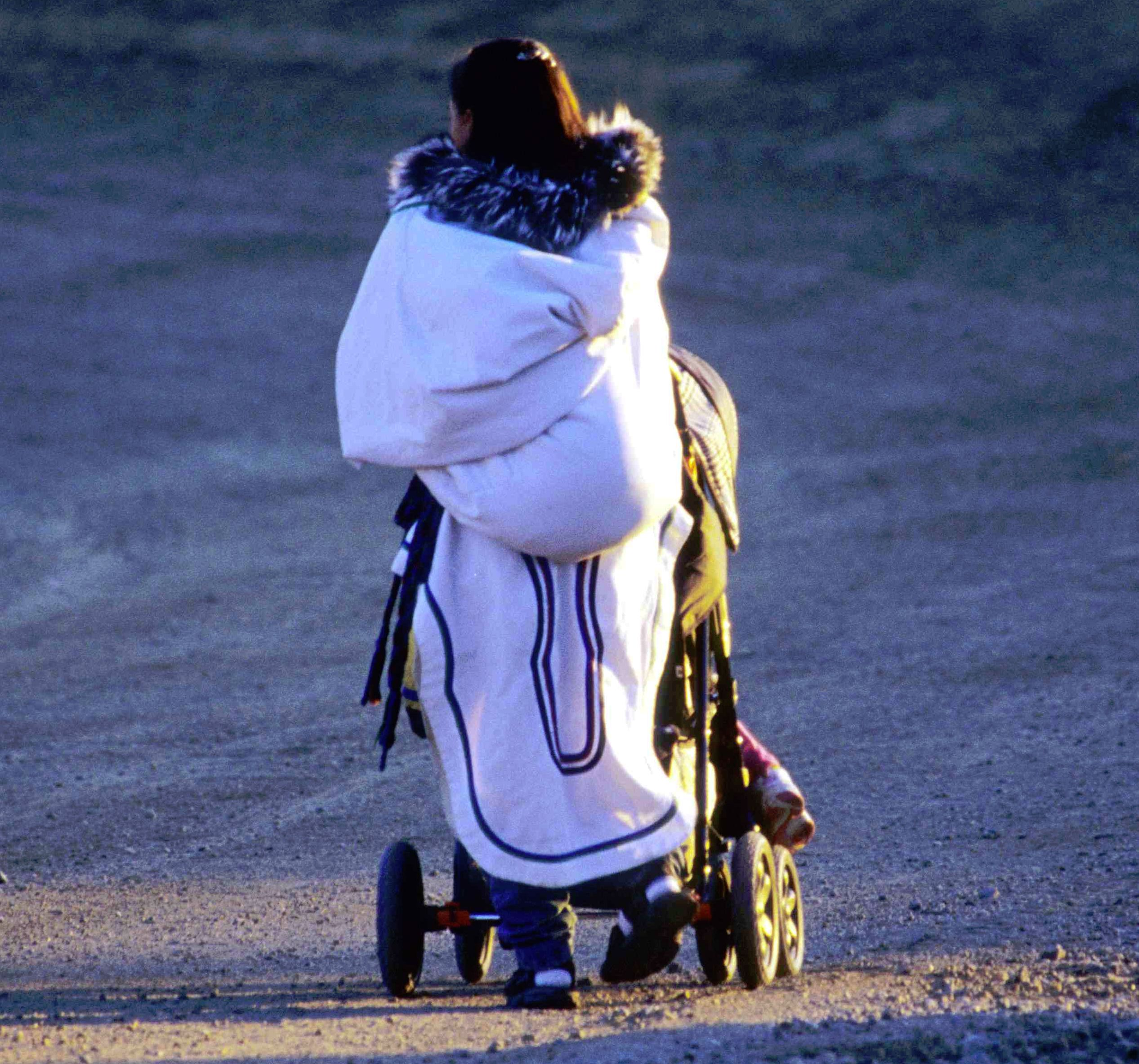
Inuit woman wearing an amauti

- The first coloured coins used in circulation
- Easy-Off – an oven cleaner invented by Herbert McCool in Regina in 1932
- Egg carton – invented by Joseph Coyle of Smithers, British Columbia, in 1911
- Electric cooking range – invented by Thomas Ahearn in 1882
- Garbage bag – invented by Harry Wasylyk in 1950
- Green ink – invented by American Thomas Sterry Hunt in 1862 while teaching at Université Laval; used for various U.S. banknotes
- Igloos – a type of shelter from the Arctic
- Incandescent light bulb – invented in 1874 by Henry Woodward, who sold the patent to Thomas Edison
- Jolly Jumper – a baby jumper invented by Olivia Poole in 1959
- Kerosene – discovered in the 1840s by Abraham Gesner
- Lawn sprinkler – invented by Elijah McCoy
- LongPen – invented by Margaret Atwood
- Parka – invented by the Inuit in the Arctic to protect the wearer from the cold
- Plexiglas – made practical by William Chalmers' invention for creating methyl methacrylate, while a graduate student at McGill University in 1931
- Snow goggles – used by Inuit to prevent snow blindness in the Arctic due to the glare from snow and ice and were made typically from ivory, bone or other materials
- Snowshoes – perfected by First Nations to traverse through deep snow more effectively
- Wonderbra Model 1300 (aka Dream Lift) – the modern plunged-style push-up bra, designed by Louise Poirier in 1964. Though the term Wonder-Bra was coined by an American named Israel Pilot in 1935, the brand itself was popularized by Canadian Moses Nadler, who licensed (and later won) the Wonderbra patent from Pilot. Nadler made his first Wonderbra in 1939 at his Montreal-based Canadian Lady Corset Company, and directed Poirier, his employee, to design the Model 1300 bra

=== Science and medicine ===
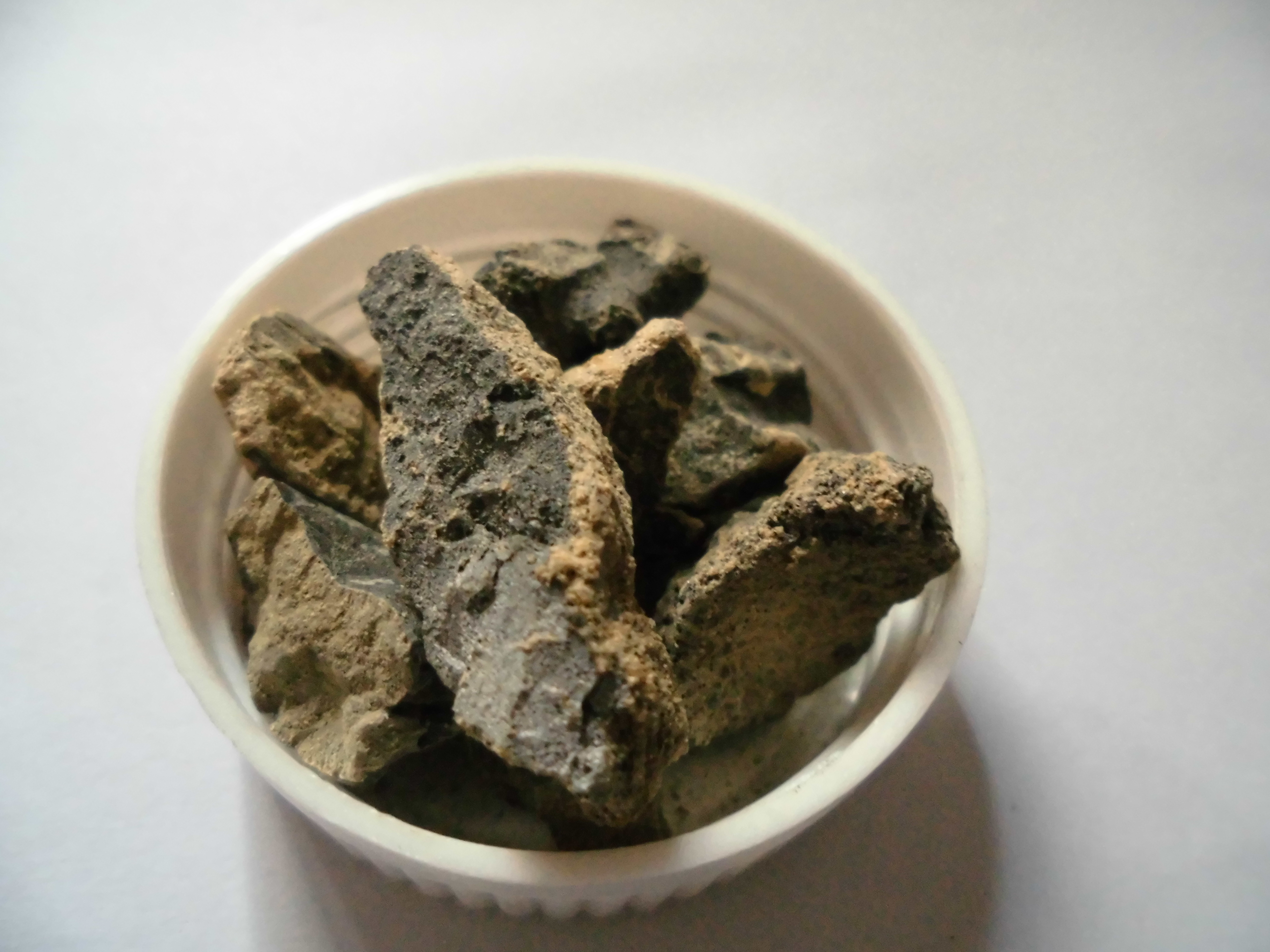
Calcium carbide

- A process for producing calcium carbide for acetylene was invented by Thomas Willson in 1892
- Artificial cardiac pacemaker – invented by John Alexander Hopps in 1950/1951
- A process to extract bromine was invented by Herbert Henry Dow in 1890
- CPR mannequin – invented by Dianne Croteau in 1989
- Ebola vaccine – discovered by researchers at the federal Public Health Agency of Canada in 2014
- The first practical electron microscope was built by James Hillier and Arthur Prebus in 1939
- Explosives vapour detector EVD-1 – invented by Dr. Lorne Elias in 1985
- Finite element method, a method for numerically solving differential equations, invented by Alexander Hrennikoff
- Forensic pathology in policing – introduced by Dr. Frances Gertrude McGill (1877–1959)
- Insulin – the process for extracting medicinal insulin was invented by Frederick Banting, Charles Best, and James Collip (1922)
- Medium 199 – the world's first purely synthetic nutrient medium for growing cells, discovered in 1945 by Dr. Raymond Parker of Connaught Laboratories at the University of Toronto. Dr. Parker's achievement had a key role in the discovery of the polio vaccine
- Montreal procedure – a treatment for severe epilepsy invented by Wilder Penfield at the Montreal Neurological Institute and Hospital in 1930, allowing patients to remain awake and describe their reactions while the surgeon stimulates different areas of the brain
- NeisVac‑C – a conjugate vaccine developed in 1982 by Harold Jennings and his Ottawa-based team for immunizing against Group C meningococcal meningitis
- Oil Red O – a forensic technique discovered by Alexandre Beaudoin in 2004
- Palm n’ Turn – child-proof container technology developed by Dr. Henri Breault in 1967
- Radon – the fifth radioactive element to be discovered, in 1899 by Ernest Rutherford and Robert B. Owens at McGill University in Montreal
- Synthetic sucrose – invented by Dr. Raymond Lemieux in 1953
- Ultraviolet index by Environment Canada scientists James B. Kerr, C. Thomas McElroy, and David I. Wardle
- UV-degradable plastic – by Dr. James Guillet in 1971
- Weevac 6 – a stretcher for babies invented by Wendy Murphy in 1985

=== Sport, music, and entertainment ===
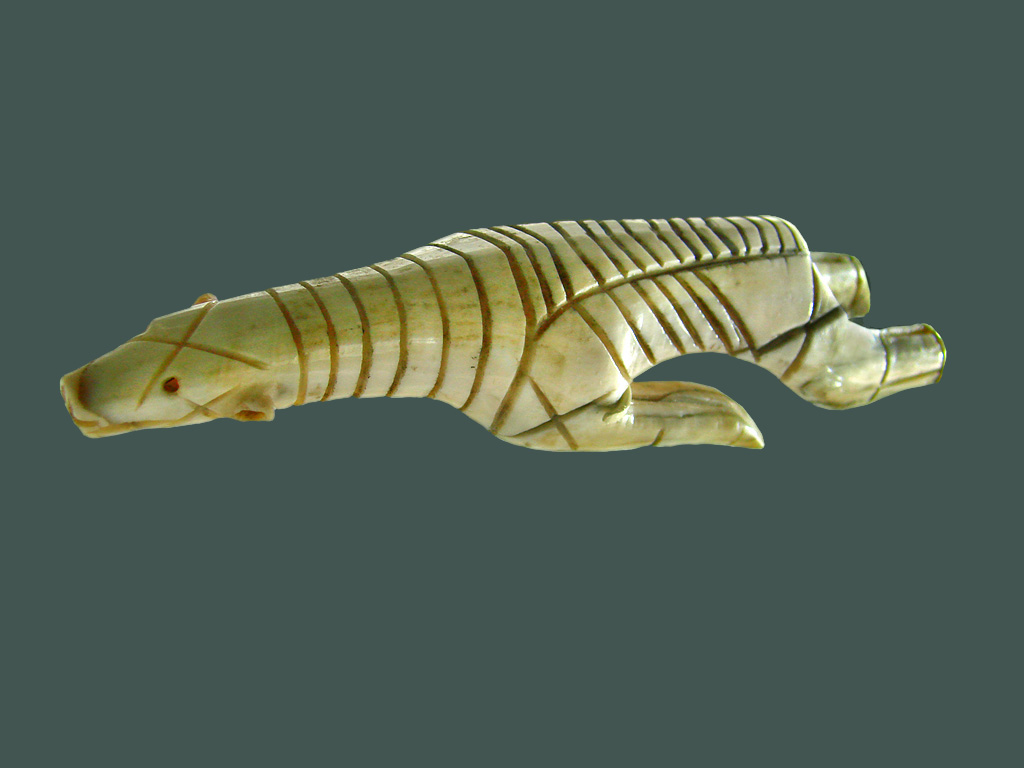
Swimming polar bear carved from walrus ivory, Middle Dorset culture, Iglulik region

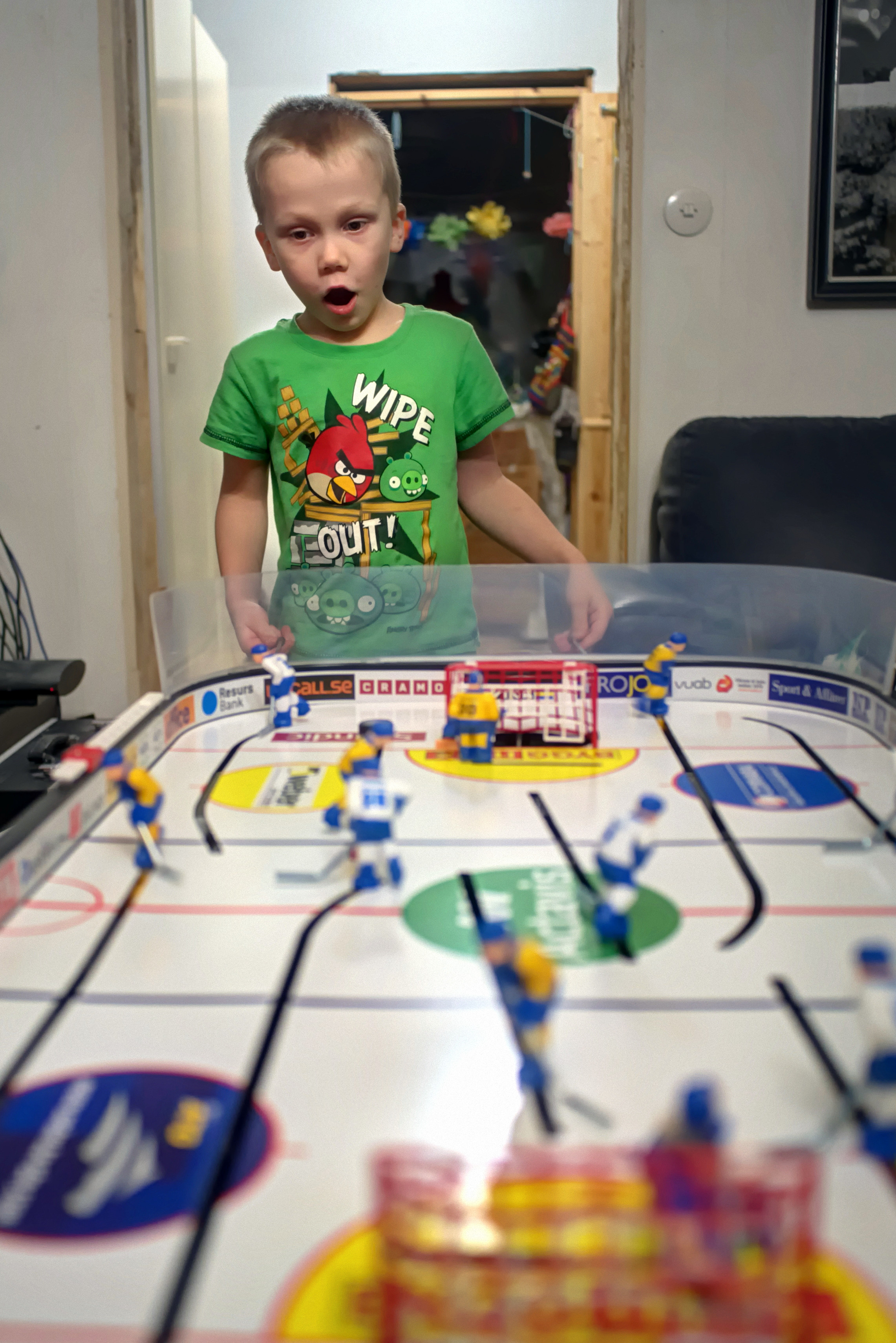
Table hockey

- Abdominizer – an abdominal exerciser invented by Dennis Colonello in 1984
- Basketball – invented by James Naismith in 1891
- Birchbark biting – an Indigenous artform made by Anishinaabe
- Baseball – one of the first ever recorded baseball type game in Canada was played in Beachville, Upper Canada on 4 June 1838
- Contrabass bugle – first produced by the Whaley Royce Company, it is the lowest-pitched brass instrument in the drum and bugle corps and marching band hornline
- Crokinole – a disk-flicking dexterity board game possibly invented by Eckhardt Wettlaufer who produced the first board in 1875
- DigiSync – a barcode reader used in motion picture production that was invented by Mike Lazaridis; it won an Emmy in 1994 and Academy Award for Technical Achievement in 1998
- Electronic sackbut – invented by Hugh Le Caine in 1945 as a precursor to voltage-controlled synthesizers
- Five-pin bowling – invented by Thomas F. Ryan in Toronto in 1909
- Goalie mask – invented by Jacques Plante in 1959
- Ice hockey – invented in 19th century Canada
- Instant replay – invented for CBC's Hockey Night in Canada in 1955
- Inuit art – art created by Inuit
- Jockstrap hard cup – added to the existing jockstrap undergarment by Guelph Elastic Hosiery in 1927
- Lacrosse – codified by William George Beers around 1860
- Northwest Coast art – art originally created by Indigenous peoples of the Pacific Northwest Coast of Canada
- Pitchnut – flicking game from Canada
- Ringette – invented by Sam Jacks and Mirl "Red" McCarthy in 1963
- Robb Wave Organ – world's first electric organ, invented and patented by Morse Robb in 1928
- Superman – co-created by Canadian cartoonist Joe Shuster in 1932
- Snocross – a racing sport involving racing specialized high performance snowmobiles
- Six String Nation – public art and history project conceived by Jowi Taylor and centred around a steel-string acoustic guitar built from a variety of artifacts collected by Taylor representing diverse cultures, communities, characters and events from every province and territory of Canada
- Table hockey game – invented by Donald Munro (1930s)
- Trivial Pursuit – invented by Chris Haney and Scott Abbott in 1979
- Tautirut – a bowed zither native to the Inuit culture in the Canadian north
- Television camera – F.C.P. Henroteau in 1934
- Qilaut – a type of frame drum that originates from the Arctic and the Inuit

=== Tools and manufacturing ===
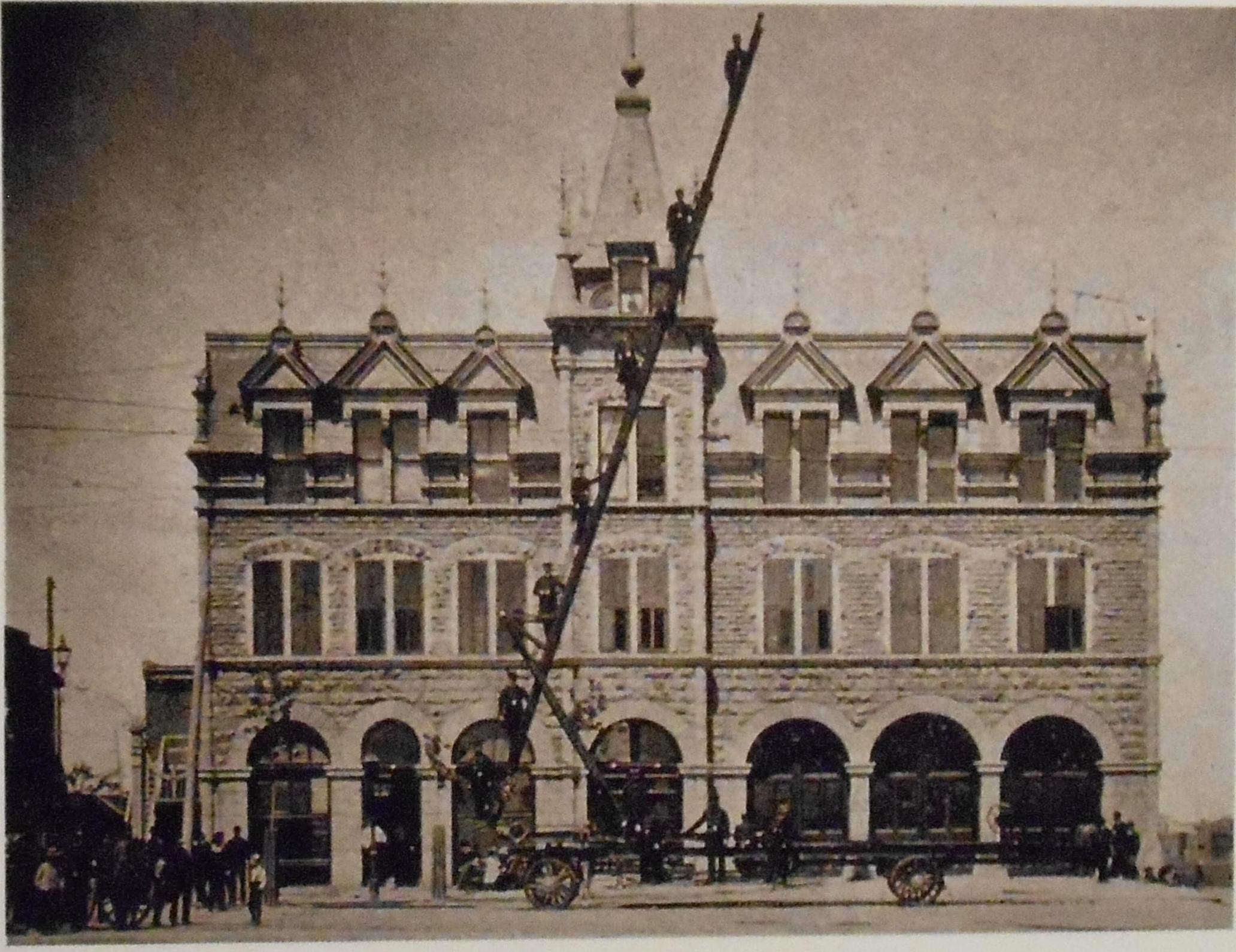
Collerette ladder

- Automatic Lubricating Cup – Elijah McCoy invented an automatic lubricator for oiling the steam engines of locomotives and ships in 1872
- Caulking gun – invented by Theodore Witte in 1894
- Collerette ladder for firefighting – invented by Montreal firefighter Rodrigue Colleret and demonstrated in London in 1896
- Kakivak – a leister used by Inuit for spear fishing and fishing at short range
- A process for distilling kerosene was invented by Abraham Pineo Gesner and made the fuel popular
- Paint roller – invented by Norman James Breakey of Toronto in 1940
- Robertson screw – invented by Peter L. Robertson in 1908
- Rotary vane pump – invented by Charles Barnes and patented in 1874
- Toggling harpoon – an Inuit tool used by Inuit while whale or seal hunting to impale the animal when thrown
- Ulu – an all-purpose knife traditionally used by Inuit women

=== Transportation and mobility ===
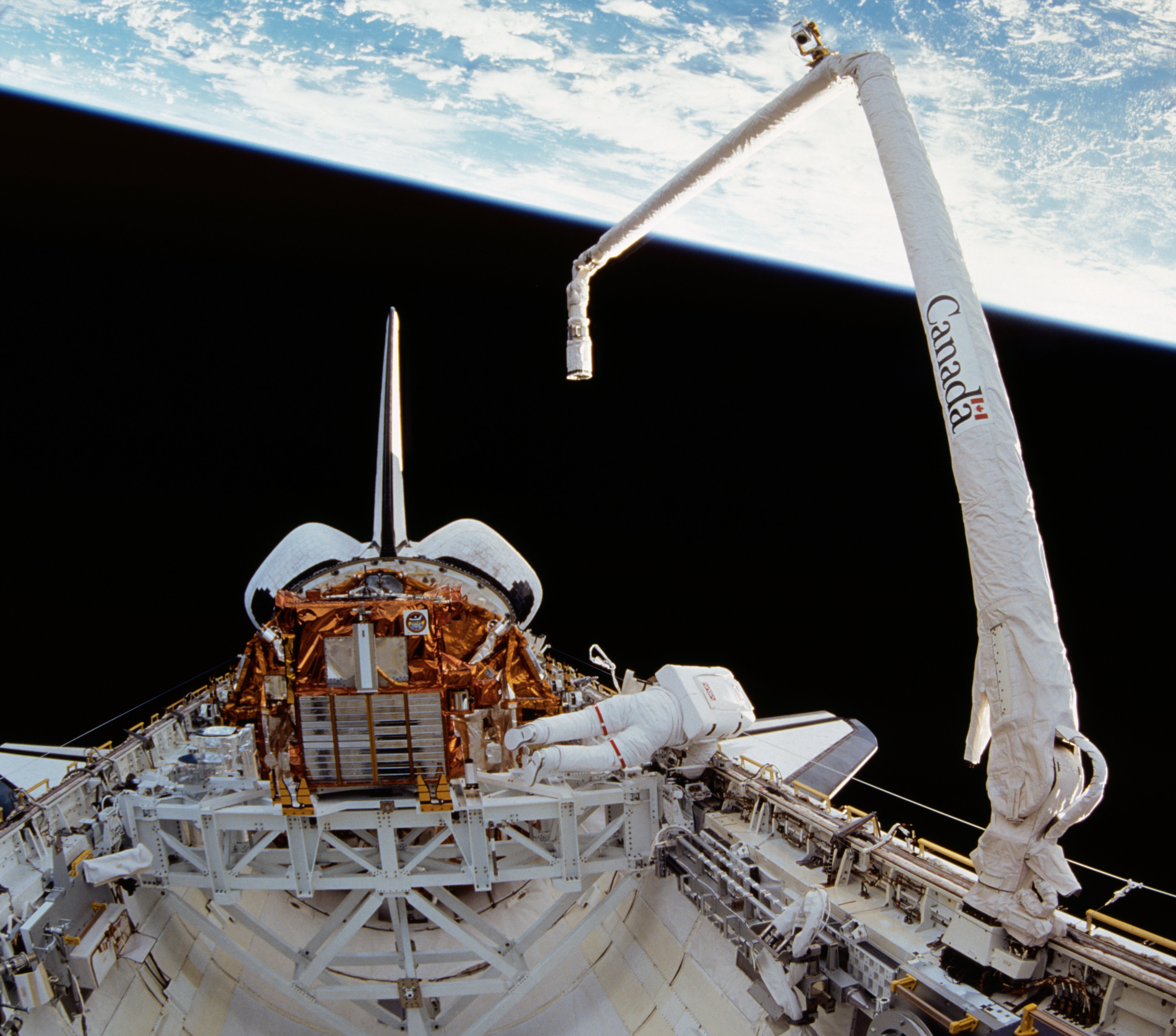
Canadarm (right) during Space Shuttle mission

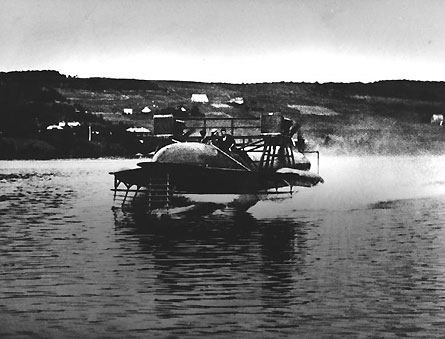
Bell hydrofoil

- Air-conditioned railway coach – invented by Henry Ruttan in 1858
- BIXI Montréal – a public bicycle-sharing system launched in Montreal in 2009
- Brunton compass – patented by David W. Brunton in 1894
- Canadarm – developed by staff of the Spar Aerospace (1981)
- Crash position indicator – invented by personnel of the National Research Council Canada in the 1950s
- Compound steam engine for marine use – invented by Benjamin Franklin Tibbetts in 1842
- Canadian – the birch bark canoe was developed by First Nations in Canada
- Electric car heater – invented by Thomas Ahearn in 1890
- Electric wheelchair – invented by George Klein in 1952 for World War II veterans
- Electrically controlled variable-pitch propeller – invented by Wallace Rupert Turnbull and tested at CFB Borden (1927)
- Hydrofoil boat – invented by Alexander Graham Bell and Casey Baldwin in 1908
- JACO – a robotic arm for wheelchairs invented by Charles Deguire and Louis-Joseph Caron L'Écuyer from the Canadian technology company Kinova
- The first commercial jetliner to fly in North America – designed by James C. Floyd, the term jetliner being derived from his Avro Canada C102 Jetliner (1949)
- Nodwell 110, a multi-purpose two-tracked vehicle – invented by Bruce Nodwell
- Parclo (partial cloverleaf) interchange – developed by planners at the Ministry of Transportation of Ontario (c. 20th century)
- Road lines – invented by John D. Millar, an engineer for the Ontario Department of Transport. The world's first road lines were subsequently painted on a stretch of highway between Ontario and Quebec in 1930
- Screw-propeller – invented by John Patch in 1833
- Separable baggage check – invented by John Michael Lyons in 1882
- Snowmobile – invented by Joseph-Armand Bombardier (1937)
- TM4 MФTIVE – a lightweight magnet electric motor invented by Pierre Couture in 1982
- Uno dicycle – invented by Ben Gulak while still a teenager in 2006
- Wheelchair-accessible bus – invented by Walter Harris Callow in 1947
- Variable-pitch aircraft propeller – Wallace Rupert Turnbull of Saint John, New Brunswick, Canada is credited in Canada for creating the first variable pitch propeller in 1918
- ZENN – a two-seat battery electric vehicle that was produced by the ZENN Motor Company of Canada from 2006 to 2010

=== Animal breeds ===
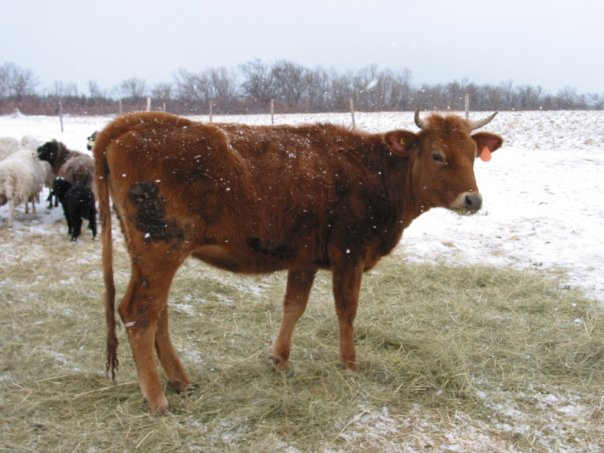
A Canadienne heifer

- Canadian Eskimo Dog – is a working breed of dog native to the Arctic
- Canadienne cattle – the only breed of dairy cattle developed in Canada
- Cymric cat – The Cymric is a muscular, compact, medium-to-large cat that weighs between 3.2 to 5.9 kg (7 to 13 lb), and Canada claims to have developed the long-haired variant
- Canadian Arcott – a breed of domestic sheep native to Canada
- Newfoundland dog – an unnamed Newfoundland is famous for saving Napoleon Bonaparte from drowning
- Canadian horse – a breed of horse that is powerful, well-muscled, and typically dark in colour
- Chantecler chicken – a breed of chicken originating at Abbey of Notre-Dame du Lac, Oka, Quebec
- Hare Indian Dog – an extinct domesticated canine; possibly a breed of domestic dog, coydog, or domesticated coyote; formerly found and originally bred in northern Canada by the Sahtu (Hare Indians) for coursing

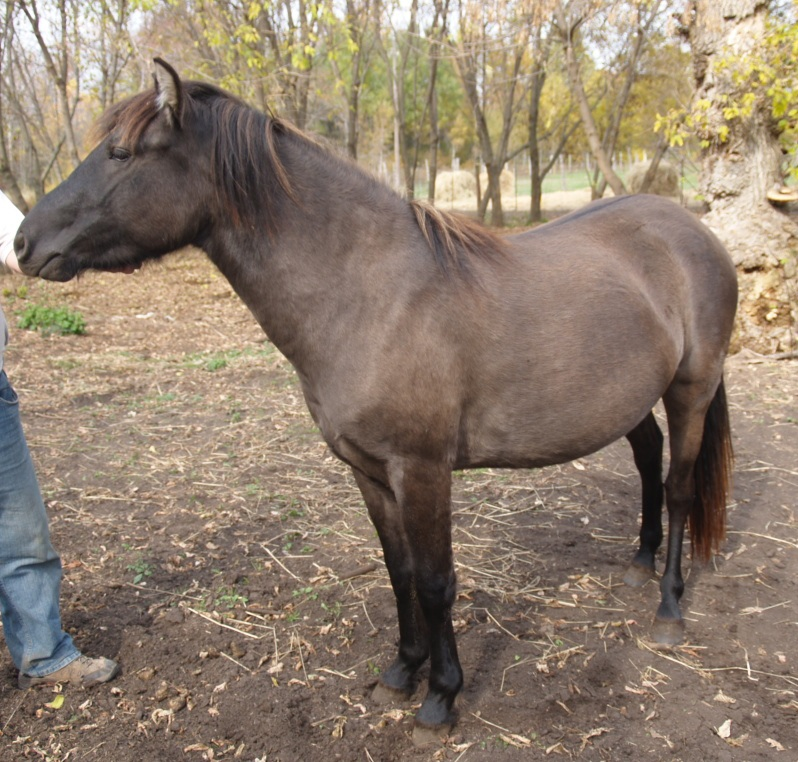
Lac La Croix mare

- Lac La Croix Indian Pony – also known as the Ojibwe pony (bebezhigooganzhii, mishdatim) is a semi-feral Canadian horse breed developed by the Ojibwe
- Landseer dog – canine breed, the Landseer was developed in Canada and in continental Europe, a black and white variant of the Newfoundland is acknowledged as a distinct breed
- Lacombe pig – breed of swine from Alberta
- Labrador Retriever – breed of dog developed in the United Kingdom from St. John's water dogs imported from the colony of Newfoundland
- Nova Scotia Duck Tolling Retriever – a hunting-focused medium-sized gundog breed
- Newfoundland sheep – a breed of sheep native to Newfoundland
- Red Shaver – a sex-related breed of chicken called the Red Shaver was created in Canada
- Speckle Park – a modern Canadian breed of beef cattle
- Sphynx cat – cats of the Canadian Sphynx breed are distinguished by their lack of fur
- St. John's water dog – an extinct landrace of domestic dog from Newfoundland
- Tahltan Bear Dog – a breed of dog that came to Canada in early migrations and acclimatised to the environment
- Tonkinese cat – Tonkinese cats are intelligent, loud, lively, and typically people-oriented

=== Holidays and events ===
- Canada Day – celebrated nationwide 1 July annually, marks Canada's 1867 Confederation and establishment of dominion status,
- Civic Holiday – is a public holiday in Canada celebrated on the first Monday in August
- Family Day – In most provinces of Canada, the third Monday in February is observed as a regional statutory holiday
- National Day for Truth and Reconciliation – is a Canadian holiday to recognize the legacy of the Canadian Indian residential school system
- Nunavut Day – 9 July, originated as a paid holiday for Nunavut Tunngavik Incorporated and regional Inuit associations. It became a half-day holiday for government employees in 1999 and a full day in 2001. Most employers give the day off with the notable exceptions being the federal government and the North West Company
- Ramp Ceremonies – a popular military tradition that started in the 2000s when bringing the nations fallen soldiers home
- Thanksgiving – First celebrated in 1578 in what is now Nunavut
- Victoria Day – is a federal Canadian public holiday celebrated on the last Monday preceding May 25 to honour Queen Victoria

== See also ==
- Category:Canadian inventors
- Canadian Made, television series
- The Greatest Canadian Invention, television show
- Science and technology in Canada
- Technological and industrial history of 20th-century Canada

== External links and further reading ==
- "Top 100 Inventions Made in Canada," ThoughtCo
- Canadian invented words & terms
- Roy Mayer, Inventing Canada: 100 Years of Innovation
