= Robotnik Automation =

Spanish technology company

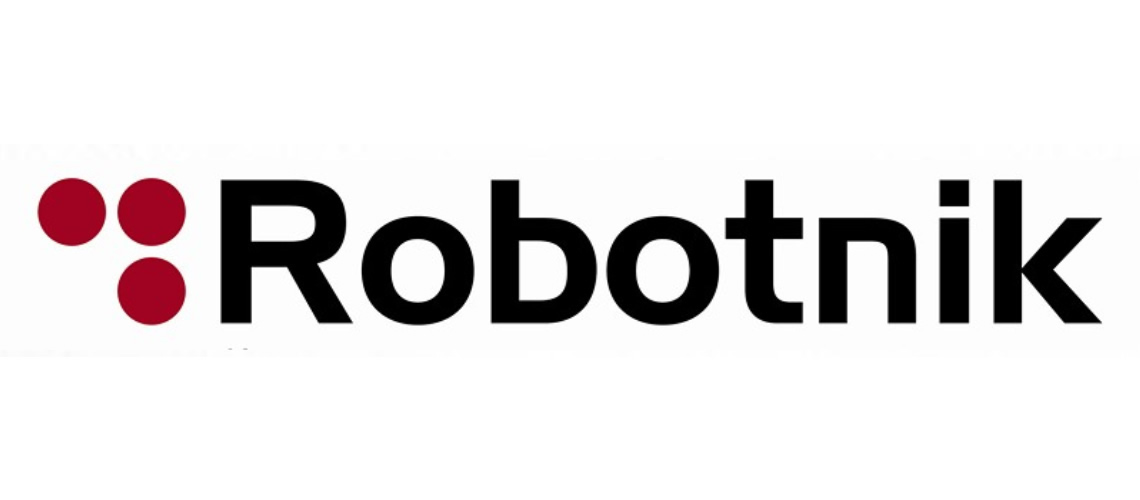
- Type: S.L.L.
- Industry: Automation
- Founded: 2002
- Headquarters: Spain (central headquarters), China, Singapore
- Area served: Worldwide
- Key people: Roberto Guzman (CEO) and Rafa López (chief Research & Development Officer)
- Products: Mobile robots, mobile manipulator, customizations
- Number of employees: 66
- Website: robotnik.eu

Robotnik Automation S.L.L. is a Spanish company that specializes in robot product development and robotics R&D projects. Robotnik is based in Valencia (Paterna) in Spain.

== History ==
Robotnik was founded in 2002 in Valencia, Spain, by Roberto Guzmán and Rafael López as a company focused on industry and service robots. In 2004, Robotnik began a line of collaboration with universities, research centers and European companies through its participation in the VI European Framework Program. The successful development of Robotrans (an autonomous indoor transport forklift) allowed Robotnik to be partners in the European projects MASMICRO and RESCUER where they developed some of the first mobile platforms of the company.

In 2005, Robotnik signed partnership agreements with international companies in the robotic sector such as Barrett Technology and Schunk. Subsequently, these agreements have been extended to companies like Kinova, Shadow and Aldebaran Robotics.

With more than 20 years of experience, they are present in more than 50 countries, specially in the main international markets of Korea, Japan, China, Singapore, the United States, France, Germany, and Italy.

Robotnik has developed and manufactured service robots for:

- Logistics
- Inspection
- Nuclear industry
- Security and military

== Certifications ==
Robotinik is certified in:

- ISO9001:15 – Design, manufacturing and commercialization of products and systems based on robotic technology.
- INNOVATIVE SME – SMEs with character and capacity for innovation.
- OHSAS 18001:2007 – Occupational Health and Safety Management Systems

== Research & development ==
Robotnik is involved in several engineering projects and R&D projects in mobile service robotics.

The company has taken part in several H2020, FP6 and FP7 EU Projects:

- AGROBOFOOD (H2020): "Business-Oriented Support to the European Robotics and Agri-food Sector, Towards a Network of Digital Innovation Hubs in Robotics.
- ACROBOTER (FP6): “Autonomous Collaborative Robots to Swing and Work in Everyday EnviRonment”.
- Autowinspec (FP7): ”Autonomous Windmill Inspection. Novel inspection technique and apparatus based on Acousto - Ultrasonics, to enable accurate estimation of the mechanical properties of the blades and their remaining lifespan.”
- Robo-spect (FP7): ”ROBotic System with Intelligent Vision and Control for Tunnel Structural INSPECTion and Evaluation.”
- ARESIVO (H2020): "Augmented Reality Enriched Situation Awareness for Border Security."
- AUDERE: "Advanced Urban Delivery and Refuse Recovery"
- BACCHUS (H2020):" Mobile Robotic Platforms for Active Inspection and Harvesting in Agricultural Areas."
- BADGER (H2020):" Robot for Autonomous Underground Trenchless Operations, mapping and navigation."
- BIMPROVE (H2020): "Improving Building Information Modelling by Realtime Tracing of Construction Processes."
- BOTS2REC (H2020): "Robots to Re-Construction."
- BRAIN-IOT (H2020): "Model-Based Framework for Dependable Sensing and Actuation in Intelligent Decentralized IOT Systems."
- CARLOS (H2020): "Cooperative Robot for Large Spaces Manufacturing."
- COBOLLEAGUE (H2020): "Collaborative Robot for the Autonomous Transportation of Heavy Parts in construction Sites."
- COROSECT (H2020): "Cognitive Robotic System for Digitalized and Networked (Automated) Insect Farms."
- CPSWARM (H2020): ”Applications of swarm algorithms in Cyber-Physical Systems."
- CREST (H2020): "Fighting Crime and Terrorism with an IOT-Enabled Autonomous Platform Based on an Ecosystem of Advanced Intelligence, Operations and Investigation Technologies."
- DECENTER (H2020): "Decentralised Technologies for Orchestrated Cloud-to-Edge Intelligence
- ENDORSE (H2020): "Energy Downstream Services – Providing Energy Components for GMES."
- FASTER (H2020): "First responder Advanced Technologies for Safe and Efficient Emergency Response."
- FLEXITOOL (FP7): "Flexible Tooling for the manufacture of free-form architectural cladding and façades"
- GUARDIANS (FP6): “Group of Unmanned Assistant Robots Deployed In Aggregative Navigation supported by Scent detection”
- HR-RECYCLER (H2020): "Hybrid Human–Robot Recycling Plant for Electrical and Electronic Equipment."
- I-SUPPORT (FP6): "Service Robotics system for Bathing Tasks"
- INJER-ЯOBOTS (ECHORD++): "Universal Robotic System for Grafting of Seedling."
- INTREPID (H2020): "Intelligent Toolkit for Reconnaissance and Assessment in Perilous Incidents."
- MASMICRO (FP6): “Integration of manufacturing systems for mass-manufacture of miniature/micro products”
- MOORINSPECT (FP7): “Development of an advanced medium range ultrasonic technique for mooring chains inspection in water”
- PHARAON (H2020): "Pilots for Healthy and Active Ageing."
- PILOTING (H2020): "Pilots for Robotic Inspection and Maintenance Grounded on Advanced Intelligent Platforms and Prototype Application."
- PV-SERVITOR(FP7): “Autonomous cleaning robot for large scale photovoltaic power plants in Europe resulting in 5% cost reduction of electricity”
- RADIO (H2020): "”Unobtrusive, efficient, reliable and modular solutions for independent ageing."
- RAWFIE (H2020): "Road-, Air- and Water-Based Future Internet Experimentation."
- RESCUER (FP6): “Improvement of emergency risk management through secure mobile mechatronic support to bomb disposal”
- RESPOND-A (H2020): "Next-Generation Equipment Tools and Mission-Critical Strategies for First Responders."
- RISING (Eurostars)
- ROBOFOOT (FP7): ”Smart Robotics for High Added Value Footwear Industry”
- ROBORDER (H2020): ”Autonomous Swarm of Heterogeneous Robots for Border surveillance.”
- ROMAN (H2020)
- RUBICON (FP7): “Robotic UBIquitous COgnitive Network”
- SERONET (H2020)
- SRS(FP7): “Multi-Role Shadow Robotic System for Independent Living”
- SYMPHONY (H2020)
- TIRANT (H2020)
- VINBOT (FP7): “Autonomous Cloud-Computing Vineyard Robot to Optimise Yield Management and Wine Quality”
- VOJEXT (H2020):”Value of Joint Experimentation in Digital Technologies for Manufacturing and Construction”

Other research:

- Hybrid Robot – UGV–UAV (Unmanned Ground Vehicle-Unmanned Aerial Vehicle)
- Logistic and indoor robot transport through autonomous AGVs navigation
- Thermal metal spray process improvement and optimization
- RISING: Robotic Intervention System Including assessment and awareness for National police Groups

Patents:

- Methods and device for regenerating the interior surfaces of conduits by means of thermal spraying metals.

== Work groups ==
Robotnik takes part of the following collaboration groups:

- CEA: "Spanish Robotics Network"
- CEEI: "European Centre of Innovation Companies"
- AER-ATP: "Spanish Association of Robotics and Automation Technologies of Production"
- OSRF: "Open Source Robotics Foundation"
- HISPAROB: "Spanish Robotics Technology Platform"
- EUROBOTICS: "European Robotics"
