= Newfoundland sheep =

Breed of sheep

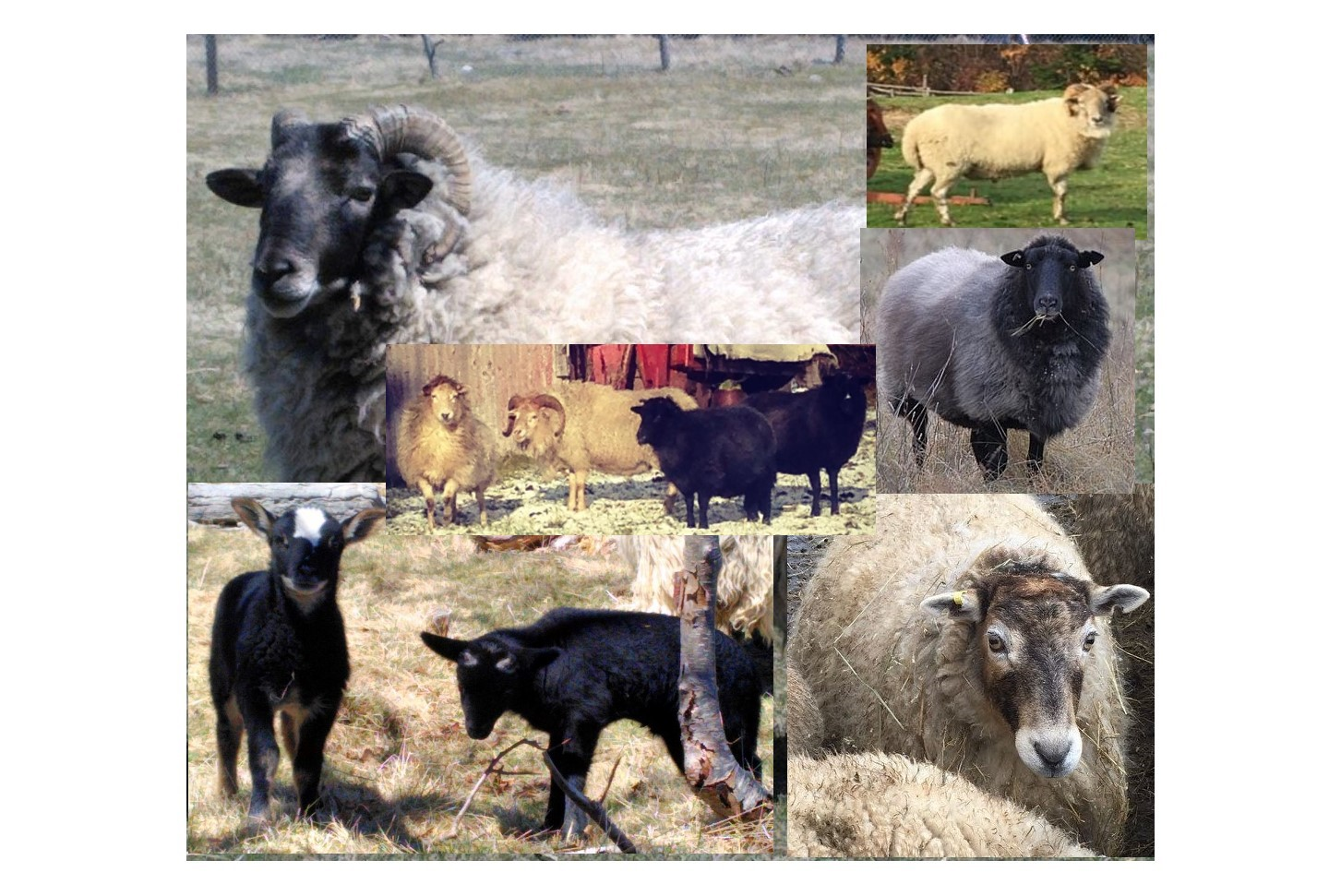

The Newfoundland, also called the Newfoundland Local, is a breed of sheep native to Newfoundland.

The Islands of Newfoundland are mainly supported through fisheries, but a persistent population of sheep has been present since the sixteenth and seventeenth centuries, and a native landrace has developed since that time. Though it has never been fully recognized as a breed, Newfoundland sheep are a distinct genetic base. Both Border Cheviot and North Ronaldsay sheep are known to have been major contributors to Newfoundland bloodlines, and there may have also been contributions from other breeds such as the Suffolk, Border Leicester, Portland Sheep and Scottish Blackface.

Newfoundland sheep show fairly wide variability, but are generally medium sheep - Very few ewes are horned, and rams can be either horned or few are polled. All Newfoundlands are characterized by a great deal of hardiness, able to survive off of poor native forage. Newfoundland Sheep are medium size and come in multiple colors.

Newfoundland Sheep lamb with complications being rare. Good mothers lambs weigh 6-8 pounds (3-4 kg) at birth.

Preliminary Results

NLS flocks across the province have developed into uniform genetic pools. That is to say there should be uniformity within each of the flocks similar to that of other registered breeds. Despite the fact that NLS are kept as small flocks, Sheep from Fortune Bay, Trinity Bay North and Notre Dame Bay had the smallest amount of genetic variability, i.e. they are more uniform than other flocks studied as a result of these small flocks being kept in isolation for 15 to 50 years. 2. The theory that if the NLS identified are classified as one group then there should be relatively small genetic differences among the flocks. The NLS from different regions have different DNA profiles which is consistent with the differences in their sizes, bone structure, face and fleece colours. There was little physical similarities across the flocks. Sheep in Trinity Bay North showed the highest difference compared with those in other regions, particularly with those in Fortune Bay and Notre Dame Bay. Such differences could be the result of different ancestral breeds, differences in climatic conditions under which these sheep have been kept for decades, There has been little information documented on the Local Newfoundland Sheep. Of the information that is documented, the author has concluded that the Border Cheviot characteristics were the most prominent breed while Blackface Highland and Portland sheep were also present. These sheep have survived through extensive management and natural selection and have been recorded to be continuous breeders, easy lambers, good mothers and late maturing lambs. A breed association is required to set the standards of Local Newfoundland Sheep and a breed registry book needs to be maintained. There has been a decent effort made to collect data on the Local Newfoundland sheep. This data needs to be analyzed by a competent animal geneticist. A breeding program needs to be set up to guide the producers into preserving the Local Newfoundland sheep. The DNA fingerprinting, though not compulsory for breed registration, will be a great asset. There has been 37 farms in which data was collected on 336 animals, there are an additional 6 or 7 farms where the animals have been let go for the summer which need to be revisited when the animals are home from summer pasture. The author found that the NLS sheep are generally white with a white face and orange mottle coloring, and a small head. A percentage (10.4%) of these sheep are black with brown coloring intermixed. Generally, "Local" Newfoundland sheep are small, narrow chested animals with a small body frame and are straight in the back with strong short legs and strong pasterns and black hooves. The late maturing trait was particularly noted in the flock of Richard Wells, Exploits Island. This was also observed in a flock on the Northern Peninsula where sheep and lambs were released on the commons in early May and were prepared for market in late November allowing for approximately 240 days to market. It was also noted that there was little information documented on the productivity of "Local" Newfoundland Sheep. This may be a result of farmers being cautious of providing information to government.

In recognizing that there has been an effort made to find what the physical phenotypic characteristics of the "Local" Newfoundland breed of sheep are (by weighing, measuring and recording of these measurements) it is the author's opinion that there are some similarities and differences in the flock of sheep across the province.

The most noticeable differences are usually tall sheep (76 cm at the shoulders) in certain areas versus short sheep (54 cm at the shoulders) which for the most part made up the greater population. The tall sheep resemble the Border Leicester body shape but not the head or face Breed the short sheep resemble the Welsh Mountain Sheep. There were sheep with clean faces (98%) versus sheep with some wool covering on the face (2%) and over the poll. while wool face may have a resemblance to the Dorset, Portland sheep or other breeds. In the general appearance of the face, the bulk of the animals resemble North Ronaldsay sheep in color and distinct appearance but in a larger size and a Border Cheviot body while there are a minority group with some resemblance to Finn sheep or Romanov mountain or island breeds which would be very new to North America. The similarities observed in the flocks across the island are the high percentage of black sheep and lambs in 10.4% of the flocks. These sheep may be indicative of the black faced Highland sheep breed as referred to in the 1955 Royal Commission Report on Agriculture. There were a percentage of the sheep with horns (80 % of rams, 4% of ewes) and though at the time of data collection there were 13 rams, many of these rams had horns which would resemble the Dorset horn. The overall body

Many people have helped in the collecting of blood samples, including Marg Zillig, Roy MacKenzie (NSDAM), Mike Wallace (US Meat Animal Research Center, Nebraska), Brian Magee (Cornell University, NY). DNA from Red Maasai was kindly provided by Dr. Alan Teale and Dr. Olivier Hanotte, the International Livestock Research Institute, Kenya. DNA samples of some of the Icelandic sheep were kindly provided by Dr. Adsridur Palsdottir, Iceland. Many of the Newfoundland Department of Forest Resources and Agrifoods' staff assisted in data and blood collection and in particular Ben Pungtilan, Morley Hann and Michelle Ralph Spears. Special thanks to the Newfoundland Local Steering Committee which is composed Howard Morry Sr., Howard Morry Jr., Richard Coffey and Dan Harwood. Many sheep breeders across Newfoundland and Canada need to be thanked for without their kind collaboration it would not have been possible to complete this experiment. Financial assistance for this project was provided by the Canada/Newfoundland Green Plan, and Canada/Newfoundland Agricultural Safety Net Program. To date there are less than 100 pure on the Island of Newfoundland

Coinciding with a general decline in sheep populations in the region, Newfoundland sheep of the native type decline to less than 200 individuals at one point. Thanks to attention by universities, rare breed organizations, and farmers, numbers have increased, but the breed is considered critically endangered still.
