= Roy Mayer =

Canadian writer and inventor

Roy Albert Philip Mayer (2 June 1940 – 8 July 2023) better known as Roy Mayer was a Canadian writer and inventor whose bestselling books celebrated innovation in Canada. These included Scientific Canadian, Invention: Quest of the Bright Idea, Inventing Canada, and Eureka: Game-in-a-book.

Mayer served as Chair of the National Flag Day Campaign, as well as in other roles related to the promotion of Canadian achievement.

In 1993, Mayer won Success magazine's $1 million Breakthrough Ideas contest for the invention of a sport fishing product.
