= Mobile manipulator =

Robot system

A mobile manipulator is a robot system built from a robotic manipulator arm mounted on a mobile platform.

== Description ==
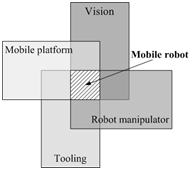
Mobile Manipulator systems; mobile platform, robot manipulator, vision and tooling

A mobile robotic system combines the mobility offered by a mobile platform and dexterity offered by the manipulator. The mobile platform offers an extended workspace to the manipulator and more degrees of freedom to operate in. However, the operation of such a system is challenging because of the many degrees of freedom and the unstructured environment that it performs in. A system is generally composed of the mobile platform, the robotic manipulator arm, vision components, and tooling components.

== Use cases ==
Mobile manipulation is a subject of focus in development and research environments. Mobile manipulators, either autonomous or remote operated, are used in many areas, such as space exploration, military operations, home care and health care. Within the industrial field, the implementation of mobile manipulators has been limited. The necessary technology entities (mobile platforms, robot manipulators, vision, and tooling) are, to a large extent, available from off-the-shelf components.

Few implementations of mobile robots in the industrial field have been reported due to the center of attention being drawn on optimization of the individual technologies, especially robot manipulators and tooling, while the integration, use, and application have been neglected in the field of industrial mobile manipulation. This means that few implementations of mobile robots, in production environments, have been reported – e.g. and.

== Timeline ==
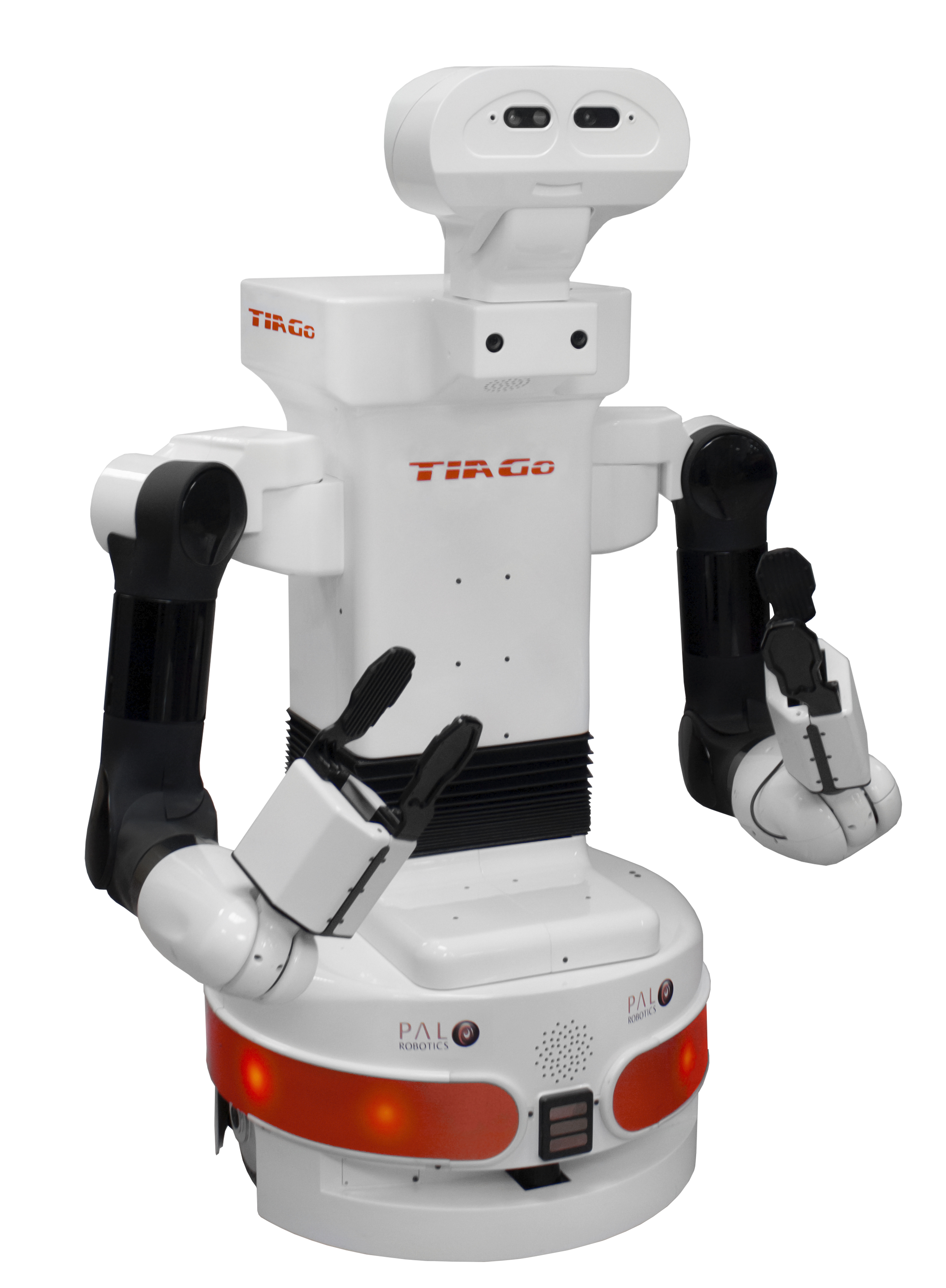
PAL Robotics' mobile manipulator TIAGo++ Robot.

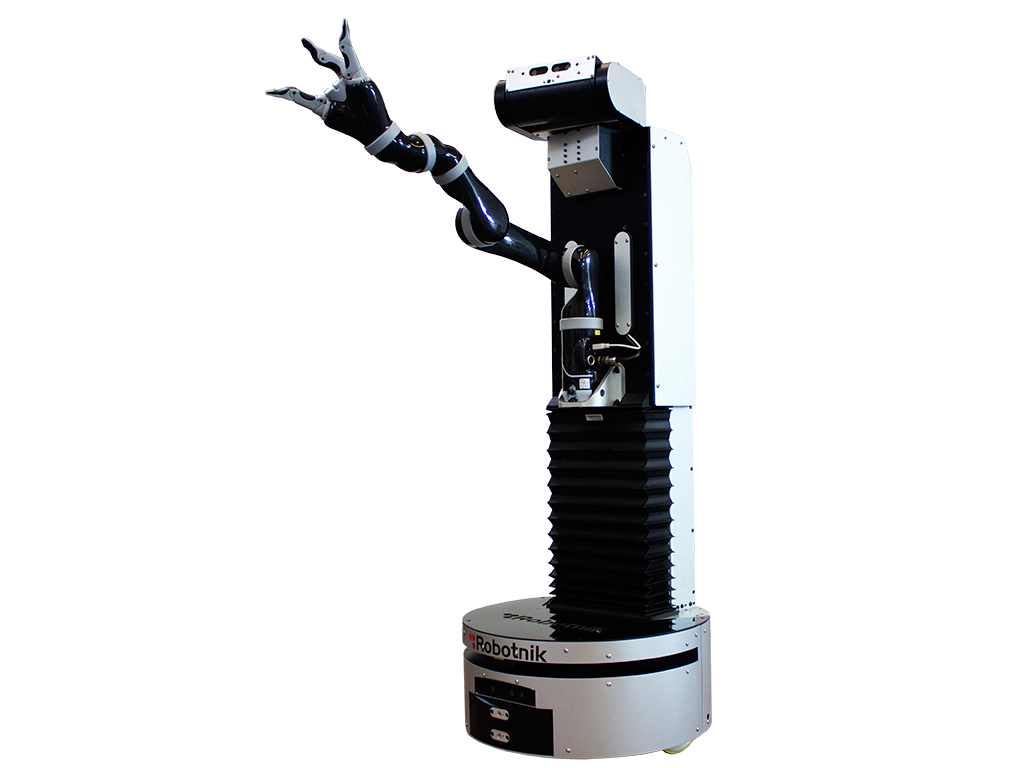
RB-1 developed by Robotnik Automation

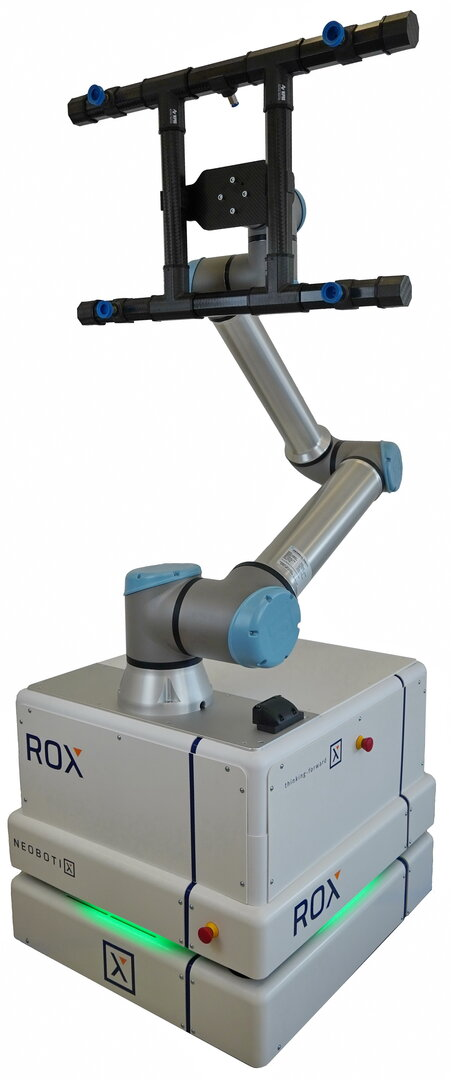
EMROX is an omnidirectional mobile manipulator, designed and developed by Neobotix GmbH.

Year	Robot name	Company / Research Institute
1984	MORO	Fraunhofer-Gesellschaft, Germany
1992	Hilare 2bis	LAAS-CNRS, France
2000	Jaume	Robotic Intelligence Lab, Jaume I University, Spain
2004	FAuStO	University of Verona, Italy
2006	MM-500	Neobotix GmbH, Germany
2009	Little Helper	Department of Production, Aalborg University, Denmark
2012	G-WAM	Robotnik Automation & Barrett Technologies, Spain & United States
2012	Human Support Robot (HSR)	Toyota, Japan
2013	UBR-1	Unbounded Robotics, United States
2013	X-WAM	Robotnik Automation & Barrett Technologies, Spain & United States
2015	CARLoS	AIMEN, Spain
2015	RB-1	Robotnik Automation & Kinova Robotics, Spain & Canada
2016	TIAGo	PAL Robotics, Spain
2018	MuR 205	Institute of Assembly Technology, Leibniz University Hanover, Germany
2024	EMROX	Neobotix GmbH, Germany

== Video example ==
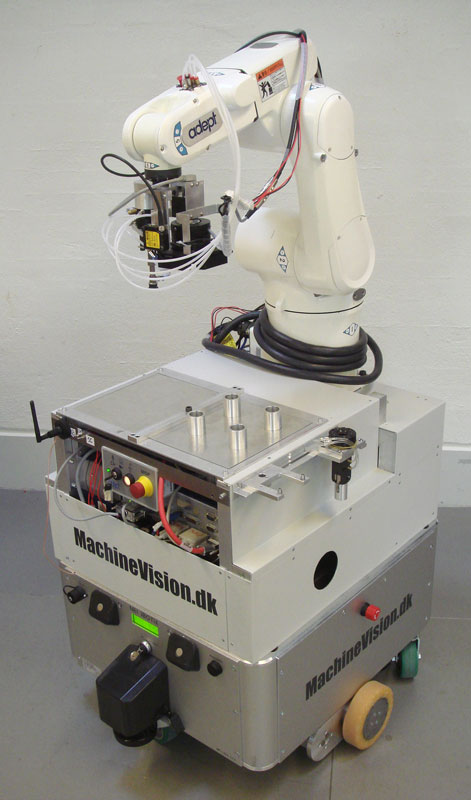
Mobile Manipulator: Little Helper – Aalborg University

One recent example is the mobile manipulator "Little Helper" from the Department of Production at Aalborg University.

== See also ==
- Cyber-physical system
- Home automation
- Remote manipulator
- Robotic arm
