= Wallace Havelock Robb =

Canadian poet and naturalist (b. 1888, d. 1976)

- Born: May 19, 1888; Belleville, Ontario
- Died: January 29, 1976 (aged 87); Abbey Dawn, Kingston, Ontario
- Spouse: Edna Ilene Burrows (d. July 2, 1978)
- Children: 3
- Relatives: Morse Robb, brother
- Writing career
- Pen name: Honorary Pine Tree Chief, Great White Eagle, The Abbé of Abbey Dawn, poet of birdland
- Years active: 1924–1976
- Genre: Poetry
- Subjects: Canadian literature, nature, Iroquois mythology

Signature
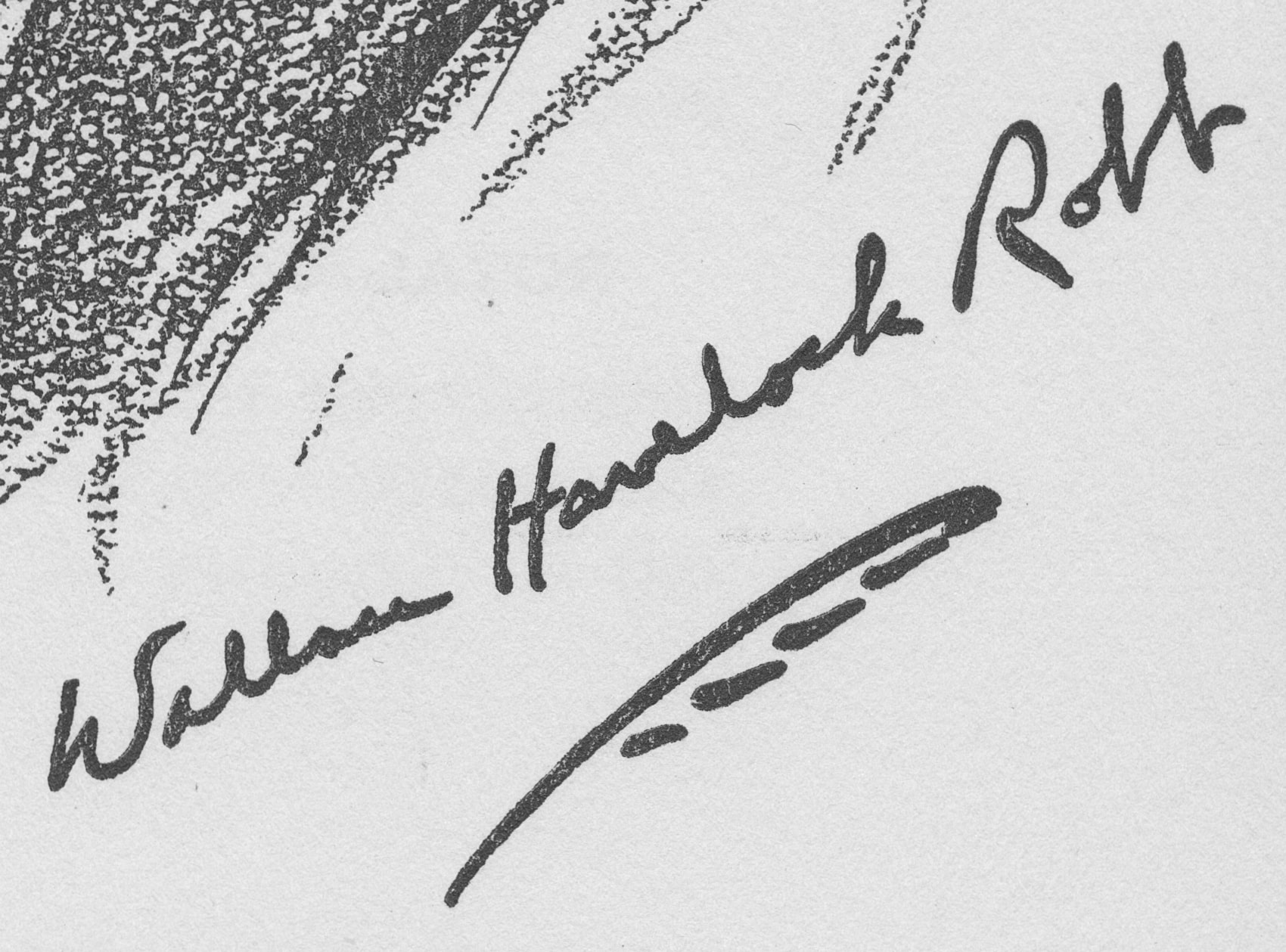

Wallace Havelock Robb (May 19, 1888 – January 29, 1976) was a Canadian poet, naturalist, and philosopher known for his poetry and prose on Canadian life and Iroquois lore. He was the founder of Abbey Dawn – a bird sanctuary, museum, art gallery, and poet's retreat – located approximately five miles east of Kingston, Ontario.

== Early life ==
Robb was born on May 19, 1888, to Montreal-born parents William Doig Robb and Catharine Haggart Black. His father was an official at the Grand Trunk Railway. Robb was the third of six children his family lived near the Grand Trunk Railway Station called the Belleville Junction on Station Street in Belleville, Ontario. In 1894, the family moved to a more upscale neighbourhood at 60 Alexander Street. In 1897, the Robb family moved to Toronto to follow William's advancing career. Here, Robb attended Lansdowne Public School, and wrote his first poem at age 10. The Robb family returned to Belleville in 1900, where Robb attended Belleville High School. Robb hid his appreciation for poetry from friends – he was active in debating, hockey, and football instead. Robb also developed an interest in birds, and established a private bird sanctuary in the gardens at the back of his Alexander Street home.

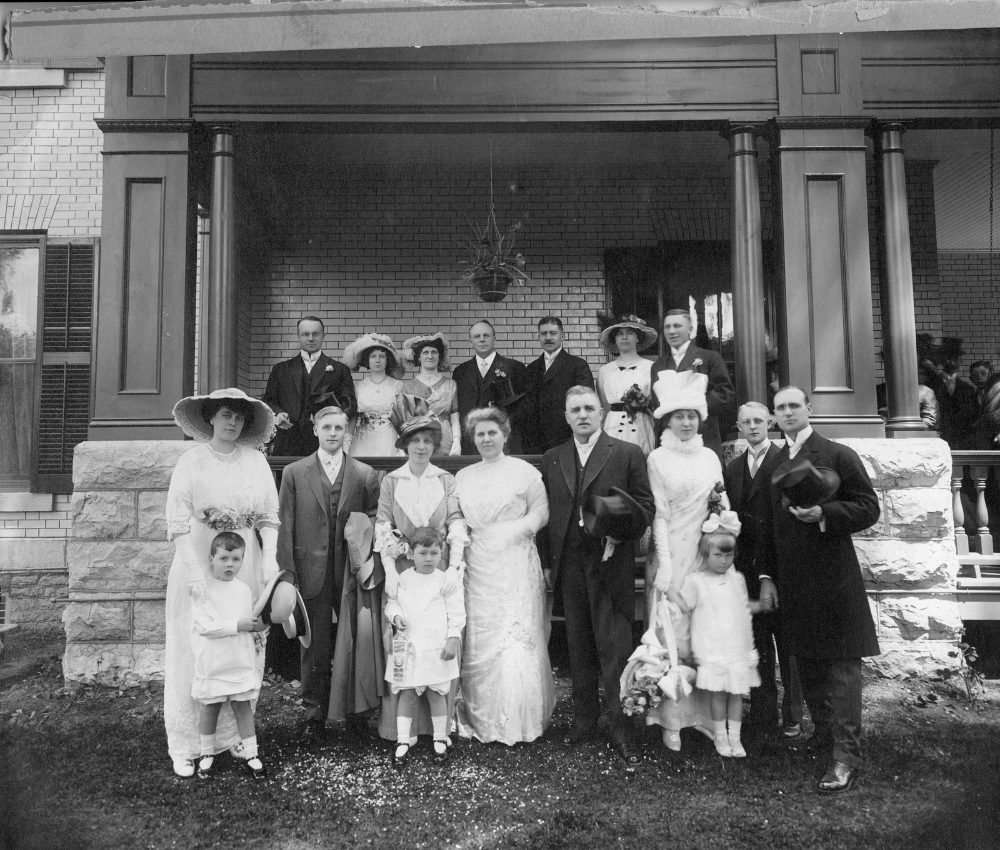
Photograph of members of the Robb and Burrows families at their wedding on June 4, 1913.

== Career ==
From 1906 to 1921, Robb was a salesman in Montreal. He started at the Canada Bronze Company and later joined the Canadian agency for the Anchor Packaging Company with four of his brothers in 1909. On June 4, 1913, Robb married Edna Ilene Burrows of Belleville. A year later, Robb served in the Great War as a Lieutenant in the Canadian Expeditionary Force from September 22 to December 31, 1914. Robb returned to Montreal where he and his wife had one daughter and two sons.

In 1921, Robb retired from sales and joined a photographic expedition in the Magdalen Islands to photograph sea birds. When he returned to Montreal, he joined the Province of Quebec Society for the Protection of Birds. His involvement with the society resulted in his joining American Audubon Society field man Herbert K. Job in a successful photography trips to the Gulf of St. Lawrence. These trips inspired Robb to pursue poetry and writing, and despite protests from family he sold his business interests to his brothers and moved to the United States with his wife and children. While there he did free-lance work in Portland, Maine, and then moved to Cazenovia, New York, where he remained until 1924.

=== Edward VIII's Patronage ===
Robb returned to Canada in 1924 when Edward VIII, then Prince of Wales, expressed interest in his Robb's inspirations. He first heard about Robb's photographic work traveling on one of William Doig Robb's trains. Edward persuaded Robb to return to Ontario to focus on writing as he thought Canada in need of good poets. When Robb agreed he became the first poet to be honoured with the Prince of Wales as a patron. This relationship had not been established since the Middle Ages, and would last for 11 years.

=== Abbey Dawn ===
Robb returned to Belleville in 1924 and initiated 'Abbey Dawn,' a bird sanctuary located outside Belleville. Robb had been given one dozen wild geese by Bellevillian bird keeper Jack Miner, and found they had been shot to death one morning in 1928. Robb took his anger to Belleville's City Hall who had refused to recognize Robb's location as an official bird sanctuary. While there he flung a bag of the dead geese on the mayor's desk and later published a long and violent poem about Belleville, in which he damned the city and all its citizens.

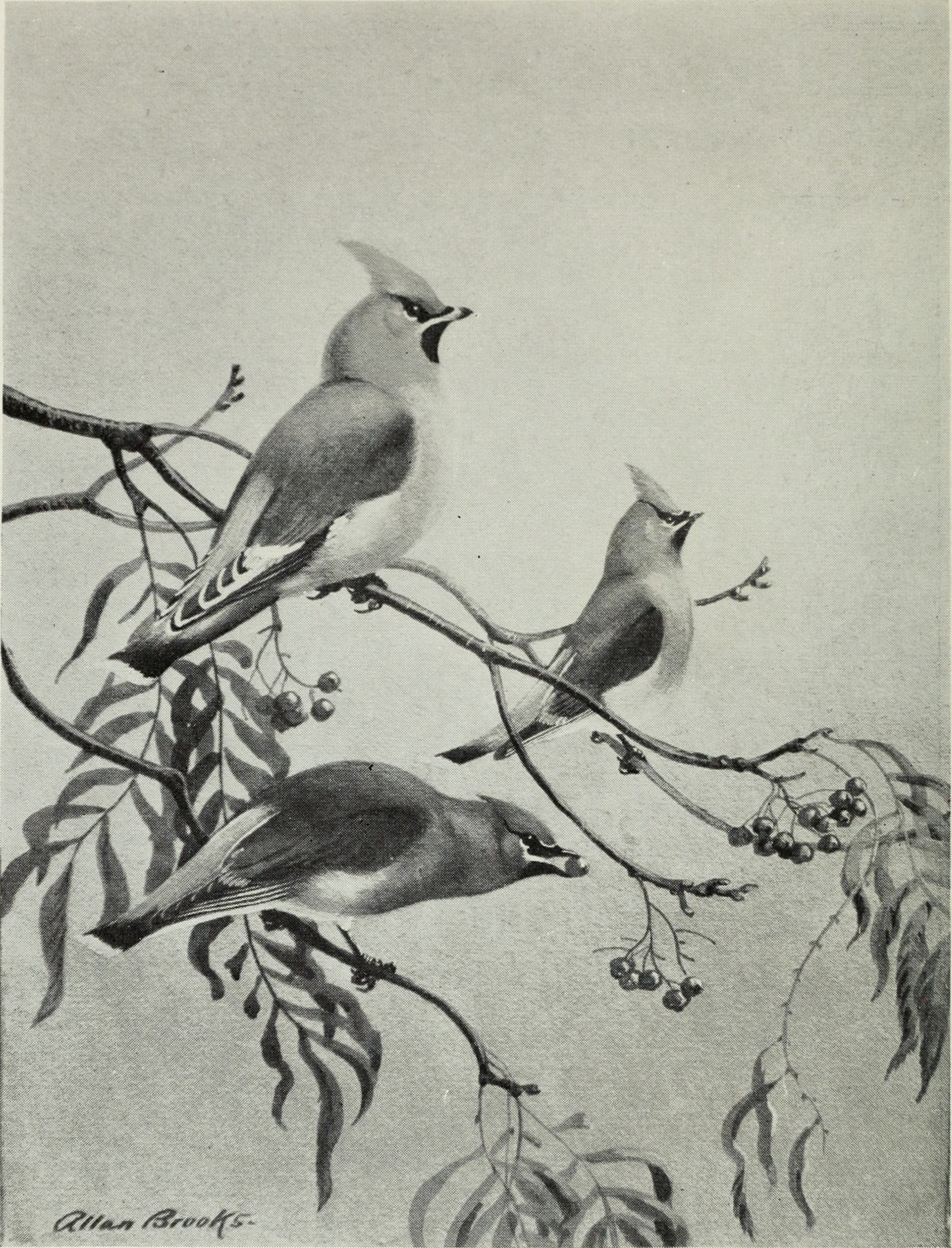
An image of a painting in the Wallace Havelock Robb collection of paintings of Canadian birds by Allan Brooks.

After this incident, Robb relocated Abbey Dawn to a plot of land approximately five miles east of Kingston, Ontario. The land, first described as a 500-acre plateau of woodland, initially served as Robb's family's home farm where they managed 84 head of cattle and crops. Over time, the land developed into a retreat and study centre for visiting poets as well as a bird sanctuary and a museum of interesting Indigenous artifacts Robb had found in the area. Visitors paid a $.50 admission fee to see the artifacts, birds, art, and listen to Robb present his poetry. One of the artists he featured in his gallery was Allan Brooks, whom Robb shared a good friendship and business relationship. The site was also the first bird sanctuary for birds of prey in North America. Robb published his written work from the location, via Abbey Dawn Press, and the area eventually gained official recognition by the Government of Ontario as the Abbey Dawn Crown Game Reserve. The official description of the game reserve is below:

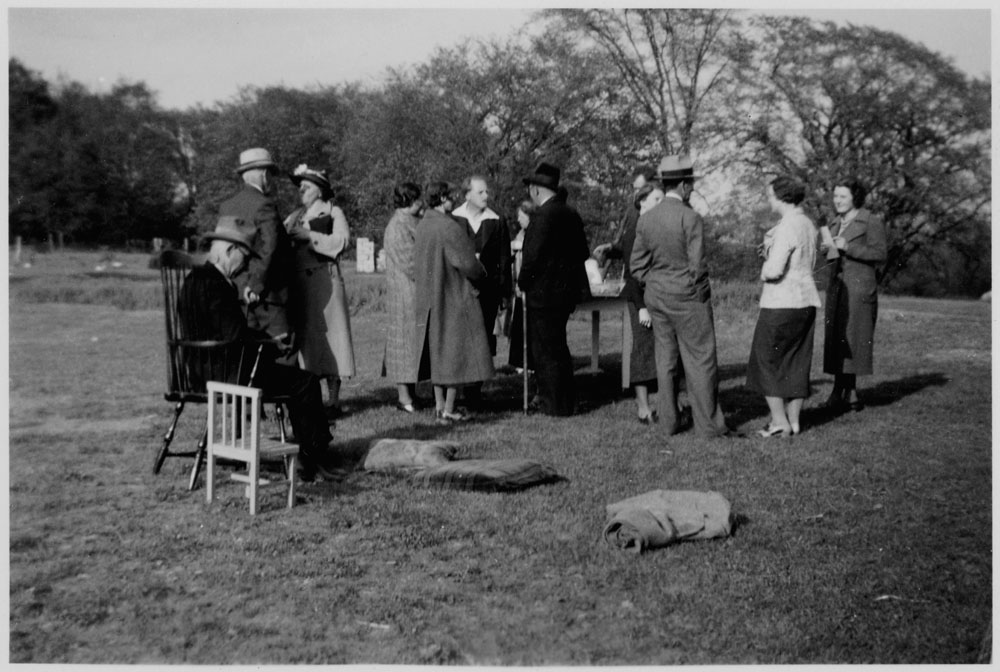
Robb giving a poetry reading, 1925.

"In the Township of Pittsburgh in the County of Frontenac, being composed of parts of lots 5, 6, and 7, in Concession I, having an area of 500 acres, more or less, and described as follows: Commencing at the north-easterly angle of Lot 7; thence southerly along the easterly boundary of that lot a distance of 94 chains, more or less, to its intersection with the northerly limit of the right-of-way of that part of the King's Highway known as number 2; thence south 52°58' west along that northerly limit a distance of 27 chains and 50 links, more or less, to the high-water mark on the northerly bank of a creek flowing through lots 5 and 6; thence westerly along that high-water mark a distance of 12 chains, more or less, to its intersection with the limit between the east and west halves of that lot 5; thence northerly along that limit a distance of 88 chains, more or less, to the northerly limit of that lot; thence easterly along the northerly limits of lots 5, 6, and 7, a distance of 48 chains and 50 links, more or less, to the place of commencement."

Abbey Dawn closed to the public in 1962 due to vandalism. Robb and his family continued to live there until his death in 1976.

==== Gitchi Nagamo ====
Gitchi Nagamo is the name of a bell Robb had cast for Abbey Dawn. Gitchi Nagamo is an Algonquin word meaning 'great sound,' which Robb further translated to 'a beautiful song.' The bell was cast in Crowden, England by Gillett and Johnston in 1936, and on the bell are the words cast from Robb's poem "Morningsong":

I give my soul to the Silent Dawn,
And it goes where the song of the birds has gone

The bell was cast to Robb's specifications, and was mounted at Abbey Dawn. It was rung twice every day at dawn and dusk, at 4:30 daily for a pastoral and then again by visiting poets and pregnant women, and then again if they day were a holiday. It was also rung when a baby was baptized at the site. Robb conducted many baptisms at Abbey Dawn – Robb claimed that poets were originally priests, and that long before Christianity, baptisms were name-giving ceremonies. Robb only baptized children of people who were not church-goers.

Robb claimed this bell was a symbol of love and happiness, representative of 'the Bluebird of Happiness.' The bell was originally commissioned out of inspiration and respect for the 'first poet of North America,' who according to Robb is simply a 'redman'.

=== Work with Mohawk people ===
Close to Belleville is Tyendinaga Mohawk Territory, a Mohawk reserve home to the Bay of Quinte Mohawks. Much of Robb's published work refers to a place called 'Kente,' which is the traditional name for the Bay of Quinte region (of which Belleville is a part). 'Quinte' is the current term for the area, having been morphed from the traditional Mohawk name, kénhte ('bay'). Robb and his wife lived with the Mohawks on this reservation for 3 1/2 years, learning the language and assisting with the preservation of the culture and its history.

Robb has been identified for his efforts in preserving and celebrating Mohawk culture. Mohawks from Six Nations of the Grand River (near Brantford, Ontario) had granted Robb the title of 'Honorary Pine Tree Chief,' and he held an honorary Mohawk name meaning 'Great White Eagle' as he was adopted as a brother of the Mohawks.

Works of his that relate to Mohawk culture and lore include Thunderbird, Tecumtha, and Kayonakonte.

== Death and legacy ==
Robb died January 29, 1976, at his home in Abbey Dawn. His obituary in the Kingston Whig-Standard described him as a "distinguished poet," and a "poet-naturalist".' His obituary was also featured in The Globe and Mail on January 31, 1976, where he was remembered for his conservation work.

His legacy remains as a vibrant Canadian poet. When performing his poems at events, he wore a 'wine-red-purple' gowned donned with native symbols on the arms. This gown was made and given to him by the woman's literacy club in Saint Catherine's. Robb had even received letters from Queen Elizabeth II congratulating him on his poetic work. The Queen had received a copy of 'Hail Canada!' after it was forwarded to her by the Governor General's residence in 1967. The letter of acknowledgement read 'Her Majesty was delighted to accept these poems. The Queen enjoyed reading them very much and thought they were a most appropriate commemoration of Canada's Centennial Year.' The Queen had also mailed Robb earlier in 1959, after Robb had written a poem about the royal yacht that the Queen was touring Canada in. The Queen had received a copy prior to her departure, and one week later Robb received a letter of thanks for the poem.

== Published work ==
Wallace Havelock Robb published multiple collections of poetry about Canadian flora and fauna and Indigenous lore, including:

- The Quill and Candle (1927)
- The Door of Dawn (1937)
- Indian Christmas Carol (1940)
- Thunderbird (1949)
- A Far Bell Calling (1949)
- Indian lore of the Bay of Quinte (1952)
- Tecumtha (1958)
- Kayanokonte (1961)
- Hail Canada! (1967)
