= Morse Robb =

Canadian inventor

F. Morse Robb
- Born: Frank Morse Robb; 28 January 1901: Belleville, Ontario, Canada
- Died: 5 October 1992 (aged 91); Belleville, Ontario, Canada
- Education: McGill University, Montreal
- Occupation: Inventor
- Spouse: Edleen Rose
- Children: Skye Robb
- Relatives: William Doig Robb (Father) Catharine Haggart Black (Mother); Joseph Robb (Brother) Wallace Havelock Robb (Brother)

Frank Morse Robb (January 28, 1902 – October 5, 1992) was a Canadian inventor and entrepreneur who resided in Belleville, Ontario. He is best known for his invention of the first electronic tone wheel organ, the Robb Wave Organ, however he has several patents to his name, in areas such as television, fuel draught carburetors, and for devices such as an 'Electronic Viewscope for the Blind'.

Robb's organ, when it was introduced in 1927, was the first electronic instrument which could mimic an acoustic organ, and predated the more well known Hammond organ, which was brought to market in 1934.

== Early life ==
Morse Robb, the son of William Doig Robb and Catherine Haggart Black, was born in Belleville, Ontario in 1901. Robb was the youngest of his siblings, among Joseph Robb, founder of Canadian company Robco Inc, and Wallace Havelock Robb, poet and founder of the bird sanctuary "Abbey Dawn". William and Catharine were both Quebec-born. William's father had emigrated from Scotland to help build the Grand Trunk Railway. William joined the GTR in 1871 and moved from city to city before settling into Belleville. He became vice president of the GTR before becoming vice-president of the Canadian National Railways and spearheading the CNR Radio project.

Morse left Belleville to attend school at McGill University, studying arts, Science, and Commerce. He also studied music under Frederick H. Blair, the organist of the Church of St. Andrew and St. Paul in Montreal. Upon his return to Belleville in 1926, he began serious work on his electronic organ design, of which he had a working prototype of by November, 1927. Robb married Edleen Rose in 1930, and they had a son, Skye. In 1934, he released a two-manual, 32 pedal Robb Wave Organ to the public. Unfortunately due to the Depression, Robb was unable to find adequate funding to continue with his organ project, and in 1938 the Robb Wave Organ Company closed its doors. After his work on the organ, Robb turned to other pursuits, including designing and making hand-wrought sterling silver dishes. Once WWII came around, Robb found himself employed by his brother's firm Joseph Robb Company, where he developed and oversaw the manufacture of an improved lanyard ring for the recuperative chambers of large guns. He continued on with the company after the war, and eventually became the General Manager of the Anchor Packing Company Division.

By the time he withdrew from the business world in 1957 he was a Senior Vice-president of the parent company. After his retirement from industry, Robb continued work on his inventions, obtaining patents in Canada, the United States, and the United Kingdom for his Electronic Viewscope for the Blind, among other inventions. The Viewscope is a headworn device that fits over the forehead, and converts light into tactile impulses. It was patented on November 28, 1972, in the United States, under patent number 3,704,378. Robb is also a published author, releasing his first and only novel, "Tan Ming", in 1955 under the pen name Lan Stormont. He has also published several short stories under the name Michael Shane.
