= Border Cheviot =

Breed of sheep

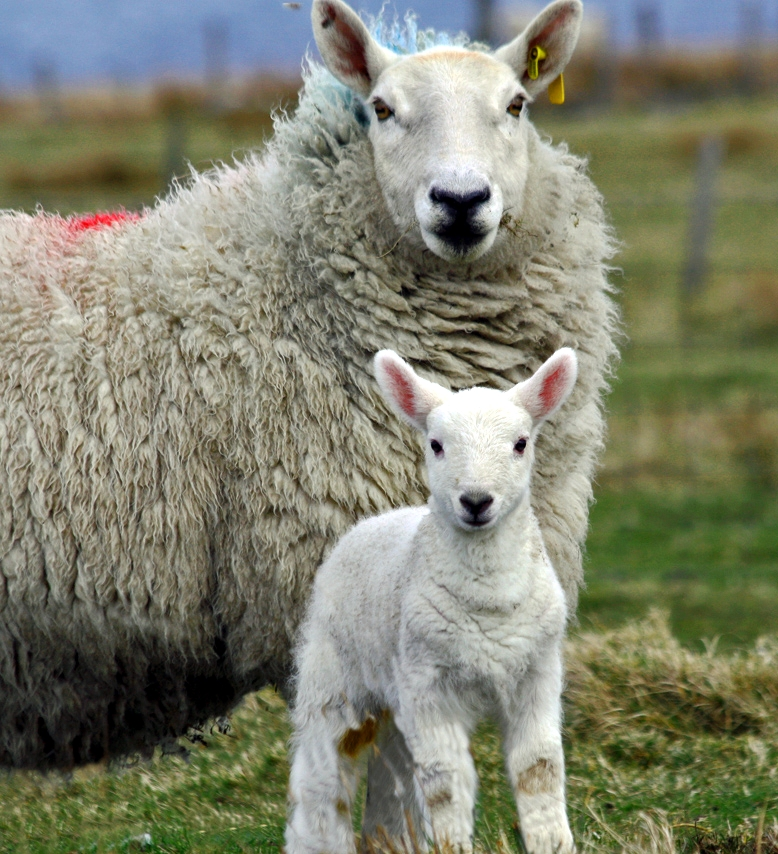
Cheviot ewe with lamb

The Border Cheviot, also known as the South Country Cheviot, is a breed of domesticated sheep from the UK. This breed is prized for its wool but bred primarily for meat.

== Characteristics ==
The live weight of a mature Border Cheviot ram is in the range of 70–85 kg and a mature ewe 55–70kg. Ewes have a lambing percentage of about 150%
