= Ragoût de boulettes =

Traditional Quebecois dish

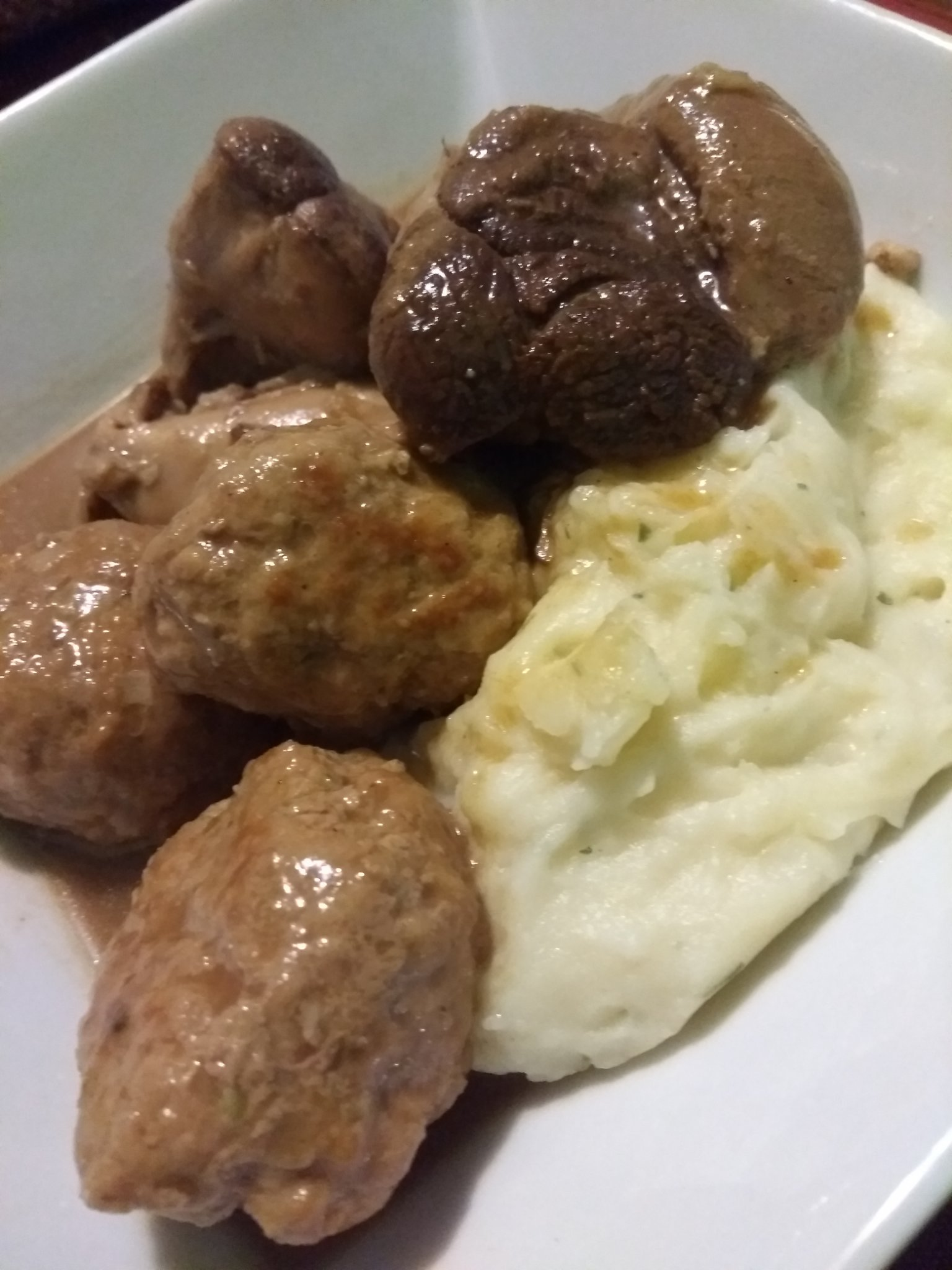
- Place of origin: Québec
- Main ingredients: Ground pork, eggs, breadcrumbs, onions
- Ingredients generally used: Nutmeg, cloves, cinnamon, parsley, toasted flour
- Variations: Beef/chicken broth, mustard, worcestershire sauce
- Similar dishes: Ragoût de Pattes de Cochon (Pig's feet stew)

Ragoût de boulettes (Meatball stew) is a traditional Québécois dish, commonly eaten during the holiday season in Québec.

== History ==
The origin of the stew is debated, however the first documented recipe comes from a Québécois cookbook from 1840, titled 'La Cuisinière canadienne'. It lists the recipe for pig's feet stew (Ragoût de Pattes de Cochon), which meatballs were commonly added to, added with the spices from a common meatball stew, showing the history of these two dishes being served together.

== Ingredients ==
A traditional ragoût de boulettes contains ground pork to make the meatballs, breadcrumbs, eggs, onions, toasted flour, and various spices, such as cloves, parsley, and cinnamon. Some recipes suggest adding worcestershire sauce, ginger, or mustard, and most include either beef or chicken broth.
