= Robb Wave Organ =

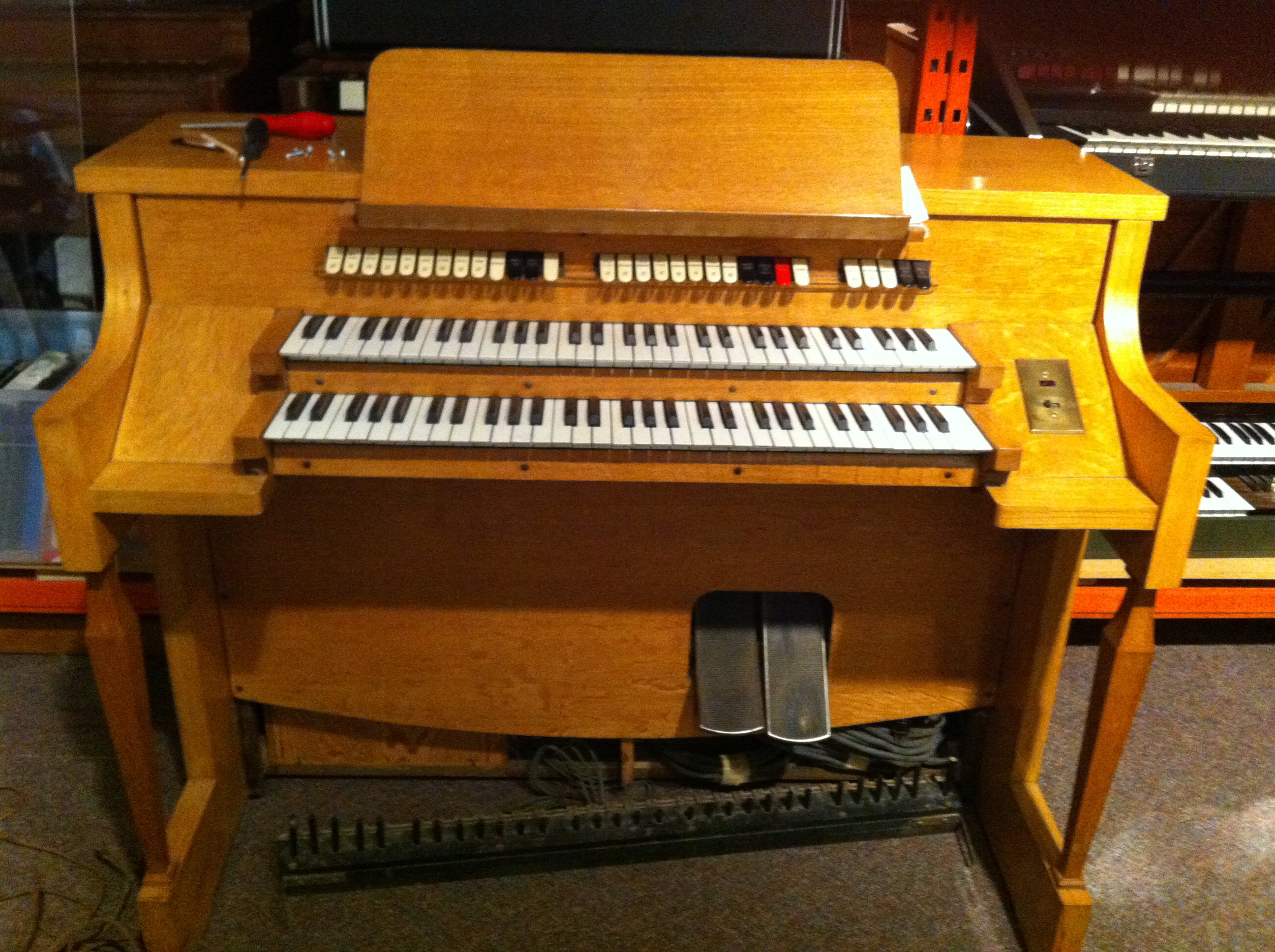
1937 Robb Wave Organ at the National Music Centre in Calgary, Alberta.

The Robb Wave Organ is an electronic organ invented in 1927 by Canadian inventor F. Morse Robb in Belleville, Ontario. It uses a unique type of tone wheel synthesis to reproduce pipe organ tones and is one of the first electronic organs ever made. While not as commercially successful as its main competitor, the Hammond organ, The Robb Wave Organ predates the Hammond (and other competitors such as Conn and the Baldwin) in conception, patents, and manufacture and release for public sale.

== History ==
Frank Morse Robb began researching and developing an electronic organ. He started with the theory that the best way to duplicate an organ tone was to start with a recording of the waveform and then find some way to recreate it electrically. Achieving this, he demonstrated a small instrument in Belleville on November 4, 1927. The instrument consisted of 8 notes, each of a different tone quality. The notes were: C E F G G# A B C^{1}. The tone quality could be modified by dial control. Robb filed patents for the organ on September 29, 1927, both in Canada and the United States, and received Canadian Patent No. 284183 on October 23, 1928, and United States Patent No. 1785915 on December 23, 1930. Robb then produced a five-octave single manual organ in 1932, followed by the Model "K", a two-manual, 32 pedal note organ in April 1934. The tone generation portion of the organ was meant to be placed in a separate room from the organ console, thus minimizing the noise generated by the spinning motors and gears. The completion of the Model "K" instrument precipitated a visit from Lady Flora Eaton, who then had Robb Wave Organs installed in both Toronto and Montreal Eaton's stores, where demonstrations were given to critics and the general public.

The Robb Wave Organ Company was incorporated on September 21, 1934. Although there was good critical reaction to the organ, only 15 to 20 were ever made. Unable to find proper funding due to the depression, Robb shut down the project in 1938. Only one organ survives partially intact, at the National Music Centre in Calgary, Alberta.

== Tone generation ==
The Robb Wave Organ, so called because of its method of synthesis of pipe organ waveforms, is a tone wheel organ like the Hammond organ, but uses a different type of tone wheel. While the Hammond relies on a form of additive synthesis by adding the frequencies of several sine wave tone wheels together at different levels in order to create the harmonics of a particular timbre, a steel tone wheel on the Robb Wave Organ contains the full waveform that is being recreated. This waveform has been carved from a picture of a pipe organ note that was played through an oscilloscope, showing the distinct waveform of that pipe organ note. The particular organ that Robb used to record these waveforms was installed at Bridge Street United Church in Belleville, Ontario. The only stop that does not use the waveform from this organ is the Flora 8' stop, which uses the sound of Lady Flora Eaton's voice for the waveform. Using twelve separate tone wheel shafts geared off of one axle and each containing several tone wheels of varying diameter and waveform pattern, Robb was able to use varying combinations of pickups around the tone wheels to create different sounding organ stops. The electrical signals generated by the pickups and the spinning tone wheels were then fed through a vacuum-tube amplifier to a loudspeaker unit. The construction and layout of the two manuals and pedal board conform to the specifications laid down by the Royal College of Organists. This was to ensure compatibility of playing between the Wave Organ and a pipe organ. The stops on the organ are as follows:

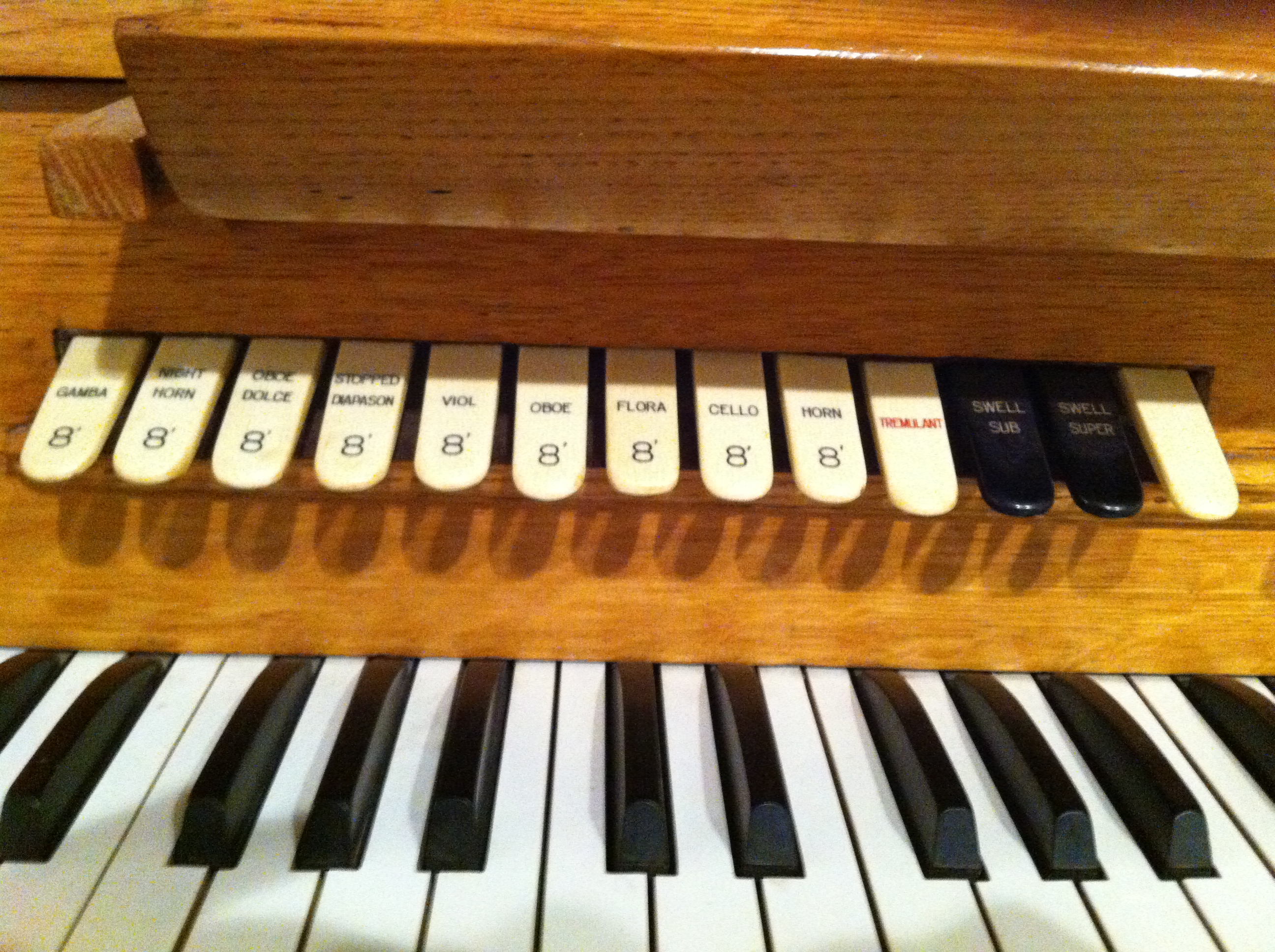
Upper manual stops.

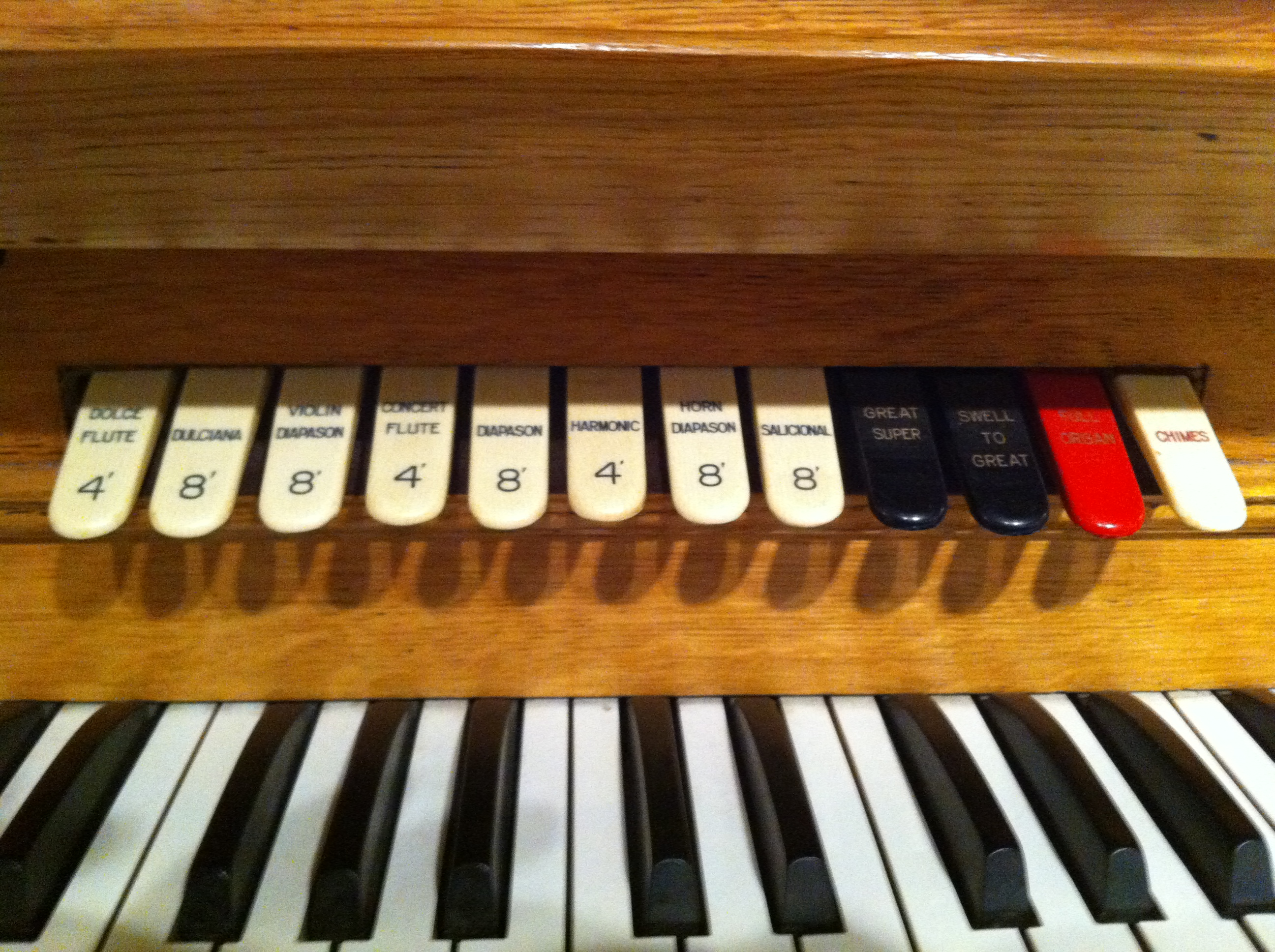
Lower manual stops.

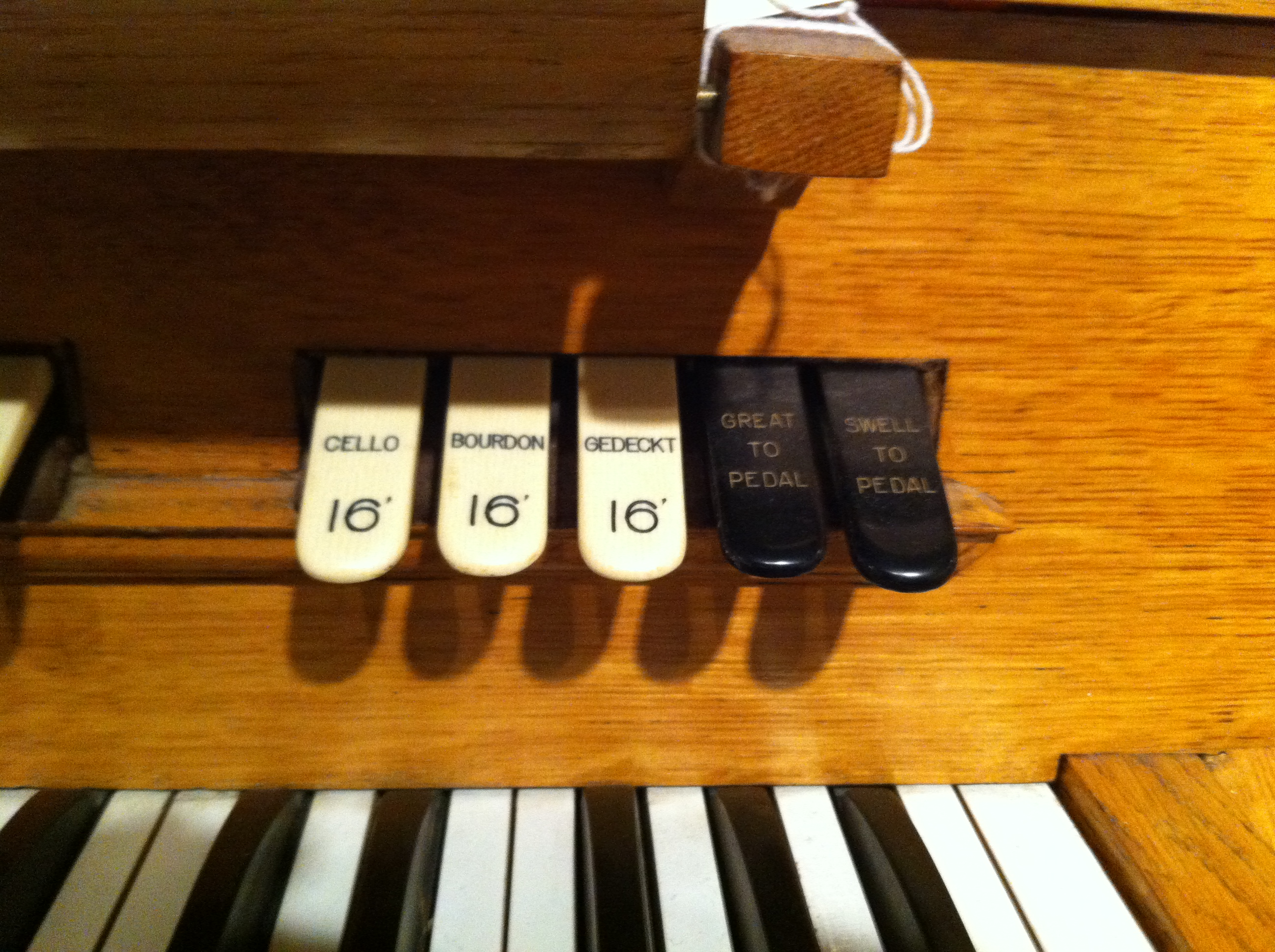
Pedal stops.

Upper Manual Stops

  - 8' - Gamba
  - 8' - Night Horn
  - 8' - Oboe Dolce
  - 8' - Stopped Diapason
  - 8' - Viol
  - 8' - Oboe
  - 8' - Flora
  - 8' - Cello
  - 8' - Horn

Lower Manual Stops

  - 4' - Dolce Flute
  - 8' - Dulciana
  - 4' - Violin Diapason
  - 4' - Concert Flute
  - 8' - Diapason
  - 4' - Harmonic
  - 8' - Horn Diapason
  - 8' - Salicional

Pedal Stops

  - 16' - Cello
  - 16' - Bourdon
  - 16' - Gedeckt

Evidence from one organ reviewer, William Barnes, shows that he much preferred the attack of the notes on the Robb Wave Organ to that of a Hammond or an Orgatron (another electronic organ of the time, one that used reeds instead of tone wheels.) Barnes wrote, "I gained the impression that the "attack" of the tone was much more like that of an organ than either the Hammond or the Orgatron." He describes the tones as "good organ tones", and "a better Trumpet quality was obtained than I had heard on any other electronic." Barnes goes on to say that the Robb Wave Organ is at a disadvantage however because of its much higher price than the Hammond or Orgatron.

== Notable uses of instrument ==
Frederick Silvester played the organ at a Toronto Promenade Symphony Concert on July 30, 1936. The piece he played was Handel's Concerto No. 2. A reviewer from the Toronto Telegram wrote, "But the wonder of it was that an organ could be designed, as this one was designed, which would produce the remarkable body of tone revealed."
