= Ragoût de Pattes de Cochon =

Traditional Quebecois dish

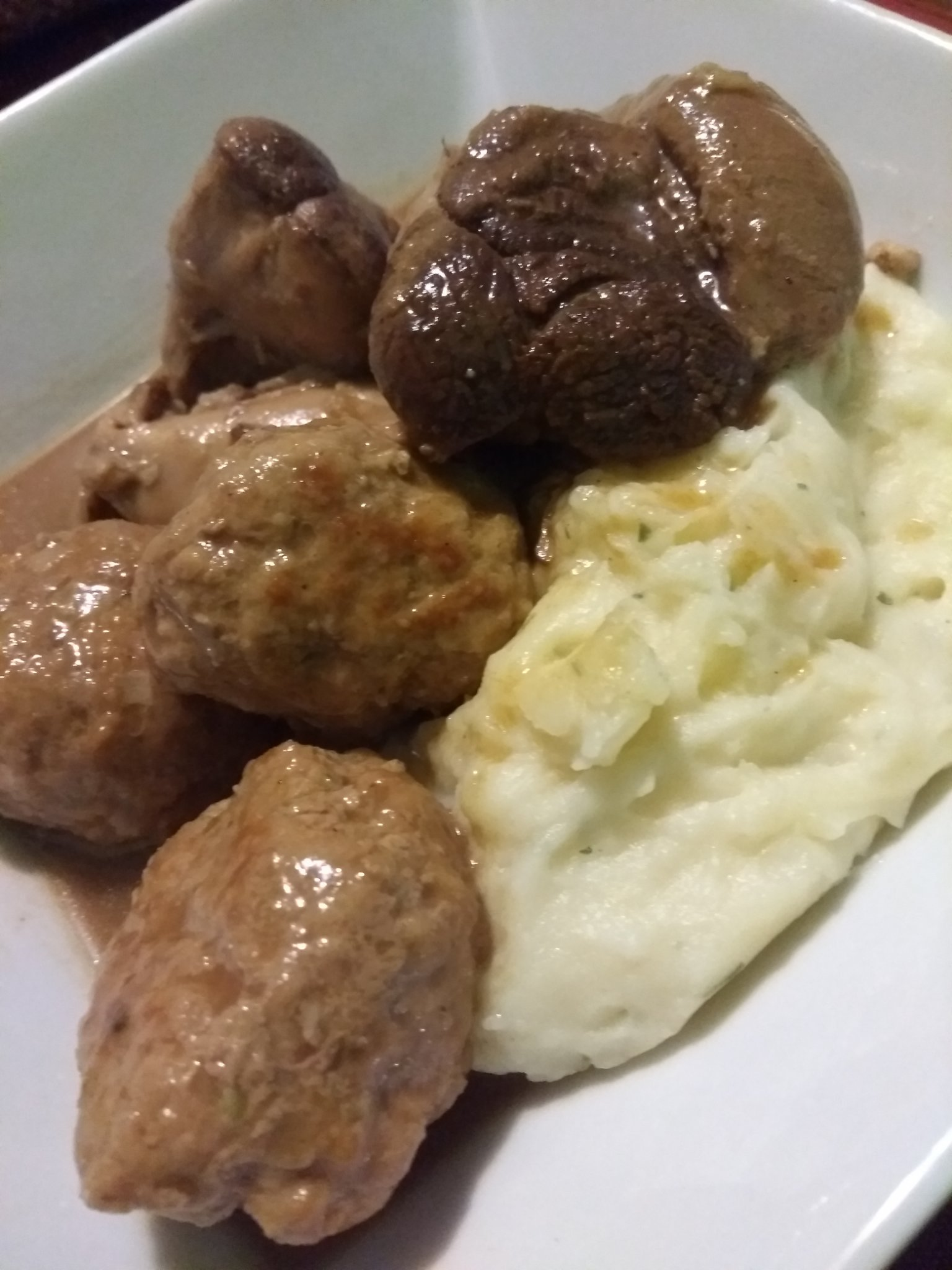
- Place of origin: Québec
- Main ingredients: pig's feet, toasted flour
- Ingredients generally used: onions, nutmeg, cloves, salt, pepper, and cinnamon
- Variations: celery, garlic, potatoes, mustard
- Similar dishes: Ragoût de boulettes (Meatball stew)

Ragoût de Pattes de Cochon (Pig's Feet Stew) is a traditional Québécois dish, commonly served with turkey, eaten during the holiday season in Québec.

== History ==
The origin of the stew is debated, however the first documented recipe comes from a Québécois cookbook from 1840, titled 'La Cuisinière canadienne'. It lists the recipe for pig's feet stew, which meatballs were commonly added to, added with the spices from a common meatball stew (Ragoût de boulettes), showing the history of these two dishes being served together.

== Ingredients ==
A traditional Ragoût de Pattes de Cochon contains pig's feet, onions, toasted flour, and spices such as nutmeg, cloves, salt, pepper, and cinnamon. Some recipes include celery, garlic, potatoes or mustard.
