= Kinova =

Canadian technology company

Kinova Robotics
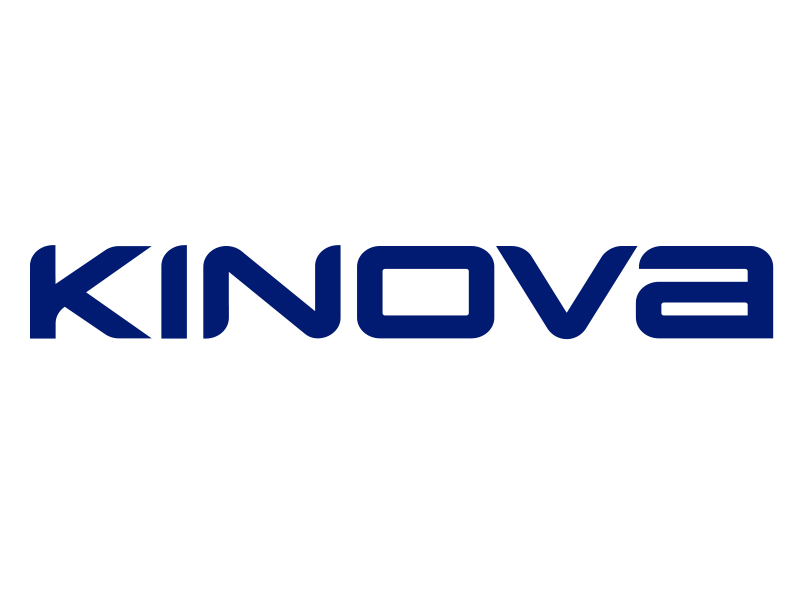
- Type: Privately held
- Industry: Robotics
- Founded: 2006
- Headquarters: Boisbriand, Quebec, Canada
- Area served: Worldwide
- Key people: Charles Deguire, Louis-Joseph L'Écuyer
- Products: Service robots, Commercial robots
- Website: kinovarobotics.com

Kinova Robotics is a Canadian technology company that manufactures service robotics platforms and applications for personal assistance. The company is headquartered in Boisbriand, Quebec, Canada.

== History ==
In 2006, Charles Deguire and Louis-Joseph L'Écuyer founded Kinova as an independent manufacturer of robotic devices. Deguire's uncle was an inventor who created a manipulator for his wheelchair, which became the basis for the company to create the robotic arms. By 2009, Kinova had introduced a robotic arm that could fit onto any standard wheelchair and allow users to feed themselves.

From 2016 to 2018, Kinova expanded its operations, opening offices in Germany and China. In 2017, Kinova announced that it had raised $25 million in funding backed by investors KTB Network, BDC Venture Capital, Fonds Manufacturier Québécois and Foxconn Technology Group. Later in the year, the company collaborated and partnered with McGill University to increase their collaborative research involving medical, surgical and assistive robotics.

== Products ==
Kinova produces the Jaco Assistive robotic arm, a six-axis robotic manipulator arm with a two- or three-finger hand to improve the life of people with mobility issues.

Kinova also provides accessories such as arm grippers, actuators and controllers.

== See also ==
- Assistive technology
- Rehabilitation robotics
- Medical robot
- Industrial robot
