= List of potato dishes =

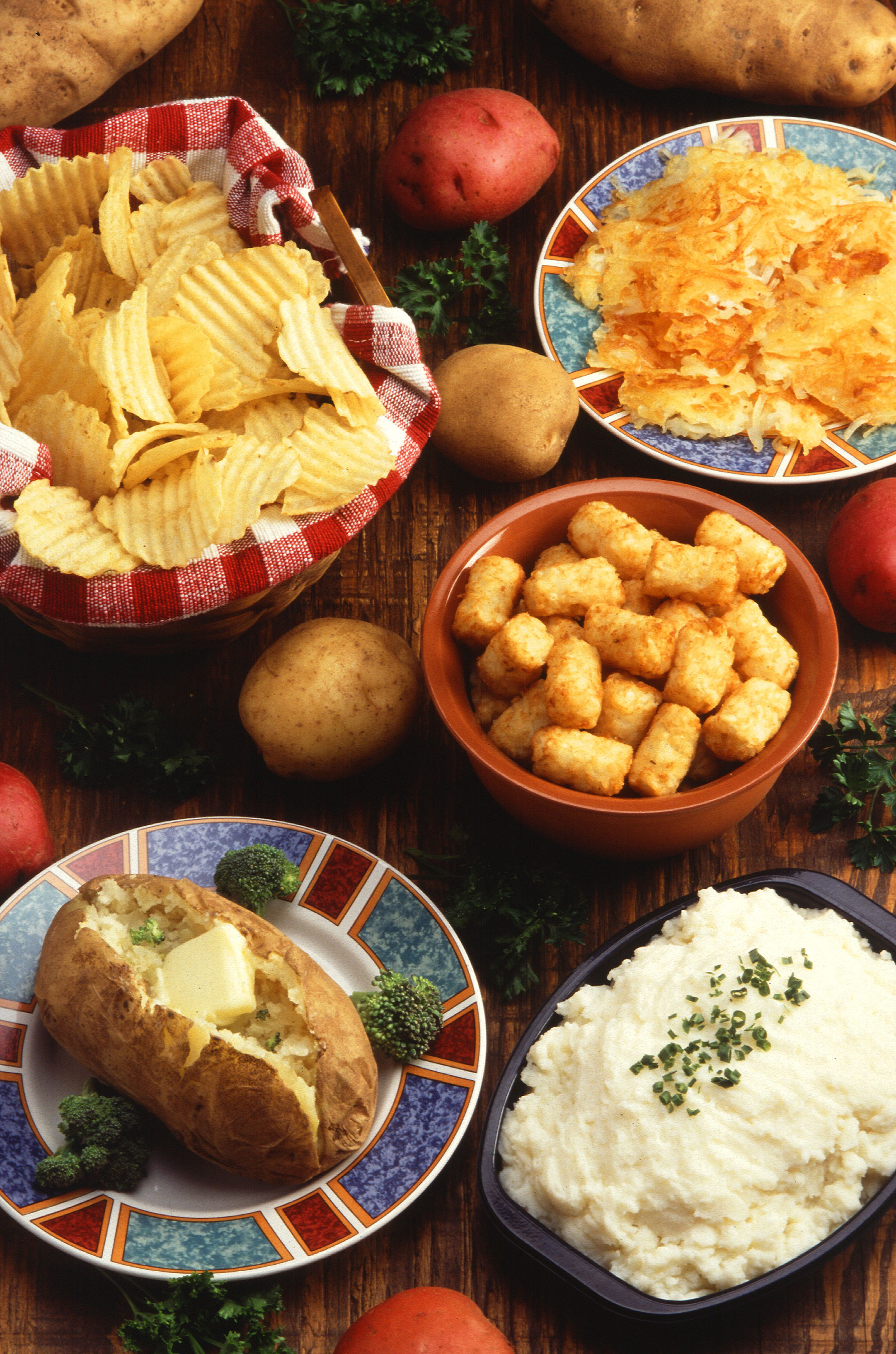
Potatoes cooked in different ways

The potato is a starchy, tuberous crop. It is the world's fourth-largest food crop, following rice, wheat and corn. The annual diet of an average global citizen in the first decade of the 21st century included about 33 kg (73 lb) of potato. The potato was first domesticated by the Andean civilizations in the region of modern-day southern Peru and extreme northwestern Bolivia between 8000 and 5000 BCE. It has since spread around the world and has become a staple crop in many countries.

The dishes listed here all use potato as their main ingredient.

Name	Image	Region	Description
Ajiaco		Colombia	A potato soup with regional variations.
Aligot		France	Made from melted cheese blended into mashed potatoes, often with garlic.
Aloo gobi		Indian subcontinent	A dish of cauliflower, potato and turmeric. It is sometimes prepared with additional spices.
Aloo gosht		Indian subcontinent	Potatoes with meat, usually lamb or mutton, in a stew-like gravy.
Aloo pie		Trinidad and Tobago	A soft, calzone-shaped pie filled with boiled, spiced and mashed potatoes and other vegetables like green peas or chana dal, and fried.
Aloo posto		West Bengal, India	Poppy seed paste and potato pieces cooked together with mustard oil and dry black chillis.
Aloo tikki		North India	A patty made of spiced boiled potato.
Älplermagronen		Switzerland	A dish made of both potatoes and pasta, refined with cream, cheese and onions.
Baeckeoffe		Alsace, France	A mix of sliced potatoes, sliced onions, cubed mutton, beef and pork which have been marinated overnight in Alsatian white wine with juniper berries and slow-cooked in a sealed ceramic casserole dish.
Baked potato		International	A potato baked in an oven; typically, but not always, served whole.
Bangers and mash		England	Mashed potatoes with sausages, topped with gravy.
Batatas a murro		Portugal	A dish of small new potatoes that are boiled or roasted and then lightly smashed (punched), seasoned with olive oil.
Batata harra		Lebanon	A spicy dish made of potatoes, red peppers, coriander, chili, and garlic, fried together in olive oil.
Batata vada		India	A savory fritter. This snack food can also be made with lentil, dal, or gram flour.
Batates bechamel		Egypt	A dish of potatoes, béchamel sauce, and meat. The béchamel sauce is made with flour, butter, milk, and white pepper powder.
Bauernfrühstück		Germany	A breakfast dish made from fried potatoes, eggs, onions, leeks or chives, and bacon or ham. It is similar to the somewhat simpler English bubble and squeak, described below.
Bengal potatoes		India	Potatoes baked with spices, peppers and curry, and then battered and deep-fried.
Bombay potatoes		India	Cubes of potato fried with spices.
Boulangère potatoes		France	Layered thinly sliced potatoes with onion cooked in a casserole dish in stock.
Bonda		India	A typical South Indian snack prepared with potatoes or other vegetables. There are various sweet and spicy versions in different regions.
Boxty		Ireland	A traditional Irish potato pancake.
Brændende kærlighed		Denmark	A dish of mashed potatoes, topped with fried bacon and onions.
Bryndzové halušky		Slovakia	Potato dumplings with sheep cheese and bacon.
Bubble and squeak		England	A traditional dish made with leftovers, the main ingredients being potato and cabbage.
Cacasse à cul nu		Ardennes department, France	Potatoes, onions, and often meat (bacon or sausage) cooked in a Dutch oven.
Canarian wrinkly potatoes		Canary Islands, Spain	A traditional salt-cooked potato dish usually served with a pepper sauce called mojo, or as an accompaniment to meat dishes.
Carne asada fries		Southwestern United States	Typically consists of French fries, carne asada, guacamole, sour cream and cheese.
Cepelinai		Lithuania	A national dish that is also eaten in northeastern Poland; a dumpling made from riced potatoes and usually stuffed with minced meat.
Chapalele		Chile	A dumpling prepared with boiled potatoes and wheat flour.
Cheese fries		International	A common fast food dish consisting of French fries covered in cheese.
Chips	For the fried potato sticks, see § French fries. For the crisp, sliced potatoes, see § Potato chip.		
Chips and dip		International	A food combination consisting of various types of chips or crisps and various dips. Pictured is crab dip with potato chips.
Chocolate-covered potato chips		United States	Deep-fried thin potato slices that have been dipped into and coated with melted chocolate or cocoa.
Chorrillana		Chile	French fries topped with sliced beef and sausages, scrambled eggs and fried onions.
Chuño		South America	A freeze-dried potato product traditionally made by Quechua and Aymara communities of Bolivia and Peru, and known in various countries of South America, including Bolivia, Chile, and Peru.
Clapshot		Scotland	A traditional Scottish dish that originated in Orkney, created by the combined mashing of swede turnips and potatoes ("neeps and tatties") with the addition of chives, butter or dripping, salt and pepper. Some versions include onions.
Coddle		Ireland	Often made to use up leftovers, and therefore without a specific recipe, coddle most commonly consists of layers of roughly sliced pork sausages and rashers (thinly sliced, somewhat fatty back bacon) with sliced potatoes and onions.
Colcannon		Ireland	A traditional dish mainly consisting of mashed potatoes with kale or cabbage.
Cottage pie		United Kingdom; Ireland	This dish consists of a bottom layer of minced beef, with a top layer of mashed potatoes. A variation using lamb mince is known as shepherd's pie.
Crisp sandwich		England	A sandwich that includes crisps (potato chips) as one of the fillings; any other common sandwich ingredient may be added.
Crocchè		Sicily, Italy	Made from mashed potato and egg, which is covered in bread crumbs and fried.
Croquette		International	A small bread-crumbed fried food roll or patty that may be prepared with a wide range of ingredients such as potato, ground meat, cheese and vegetables, among others.
Dabeli		Kachchh, India	A snack food of India, originating in the Kutch or Kachchh region of Gujarat. It is a spicy snack made by mixing boiled potatoes with a dabeli masala, and putting the mixture between pav (hamburger bun) and served with chutneys made from tamarind, date, garlic, red chilies, and other ingredients.
Di san xian		Northeastern China	Stir-fried potato, eggplant and sweet peppers.
Disco fries		New Jersey	French fries topped with brown gravy and melted shredded cheese
Duchess potatoes		France	Consists of a purée of mashed potato and egg yolk, butter, salt, pepper, and nutmeg, forced from a piping bag or hand-moulded into various shapes that are then baked
Dum aloo		Indian subcontinent	Potatoes, usually smaller ones, are first deep-fried, then cooked slowly at low flame in a gravy with spices.
Farali potatoes		India	Deep-fried potato, prepared with green chili peppers; may be eaten during fasting.
Far far		India	Snack food composed primarily of potato starch and tinted sago. May also contain tapioca and wheat flour.
Fish pie		England	A traditional casserole with a layer of white fish in béchamel sauce underneath, and a layer of mashed potatoes on top.
Fondant potatoes		France	Cylinders of potato part-cooked by frying, then finished in a simmering mixture of butter and stock.
French fries		International	Deep-fried potato sticks.
Fries with the works		Prince Edward Island, Canada	A common potato dish that consists of French fries (freshly cut or frozen) topped with gravy, ground beef, and green peas.
Fritter roll		Scotland	One or two potato fritters enclosed in a floury bap (bread roll); usually served with salt and vinegar, sometimes with tomato ketchup or brown sauce atop the fritters.
Funeral potatoes		Intermountain West region of the United States	A traditional potato hotdish or casserole of the Intermountain West region, named for its common appearance as a side dish during traditional after-funeral dinners.
Gamja ongsimi		Korea	Dumplings made from ground potato and chopped vegetables in a clear broth.
Gamjajeon		Korea	A variety of jeon, or Korean-style pancake, made by pan-frying finely grated potato in a frying pan with vegetable oil.
Game chips		England	Thin, fried slices of potato.
Gefillde		South-west Germany and Alsace, France	Gefillde are filled Raspeballs made from raw and cooked potatoes; they are known as specialties of south-west Germany and Alsace. The filling of the Raspeball can be pork, beef or liver sausage. Other ingredients can be soaked bread rolls, cut onion, parsley and leek. Traditionally the food is served with Sauerkraut and a bacon–cream sauce.
German fries		International	A preparation of fries in which potatoes are sliced into uniform sizes and shapes, fried or deep-fried, and sometimes prepared with additional cooked ingredients such as onion, green pepper and bacon.
Gnocchi		Italy	Thick, soft dumplings that may be made from semolina, ordinary wheat flour, flour and egg, flour, egg, and cheese, potato, breadcrumbs, or similar ingredients.
Gratin		France, Switzerland	A widespread food preparation technique in which an ingredient, often potato, is topped with a browned crust, often using breadcrumbs, grated cheese, egg or butter. Gratin is usually prepared in a shallow dish of some kind. It is baked or cooked under an overhead grill or broiler to form a golden crust on top and is traditionally served in its baking dish.
Hachis Parmentier		France	Made with mashed, baked potato, combined with diced meat and sauce lyonnaise and served in the hollowed-out potato skins.
Halal snack pack		Australia	Deep-fried potato chips topped with doner kebab meat and cheese. The dish is topped with a trio of garlic sauce, chilli sauce and barbecue sauce.
Hash browns		International	Potato pieces that are pan-fried after being shredded, julienned, diced, or riced.
Hasselbackspotatis (Hasselback potato)		Sweden	A baked potato cut partway through into thin slices and topped with butter and other ingredients.
Home fries		United States; United Kingdom	A type of basic potato dish made by pan- or skillet-frying chunked, sliced, wedged or diced potatoes that are sometimes unpeeled and may have been par-cooked by boiling, baking, steaming, or microwaving.
Hot hamburger plate		United States	Bread (usually white) with a hamburger patty placed on top that is then covered in French fries and topped with brown (beef) gravy.
Hutspot		Netherlands	Boiled and mashed potatoes, carrots and onion.
Janssons frestelse		Sweden	A traditional casserole made of potatoes, onions, pickled sprats, bread crumbs and cream. It is commonly included in a Swedish Christmas smörgåsbord.
Kapsalon		Netherlands	Fries, topped with döner or shawarma meat, grilled with a layer of Gouda cheese until melted and then subsequently covered with a layer of dressed salad greens.
Knish		Eastern Europe	A savory snack consisting of potato, usually covered in dough, baked, grilled, or deep-fried.
Knödel		Central Europe	Large round poached or boiled potato or bread dumplings, made without yeast.
Kopytka		Poland	Potato dumplings popular in several Central and Eastern European regions. The traditional Polish version is typically cooked in salted water, while other regional versions (such as Belarusian and Lithuanian) are baked first.
Korokke		Japan	A Japanese deep-fried dish originally related to the French croquette. Korokke is made by mixing cooked chopped meat, seafood, or vegetables with mashed potato or white sauce; shaping the mixture into a patty; rolling it in wheat flour, eggs, and Japanese-style breadcrumbs; then deep-frying this until brown on the outside.
Kouign patatez		Brittany, France	Breton for 'potato cake'; prepared with crushed boiled potatoes mixed with flour. The resulting dough is then shaped into small pancakes and pan-fried.
Kroppkaka		Sweden	Potato dumplings with a filling of onions and pork or bacon.
Kugel		Ashkenazi Jews, Europe	A pudding or casserole made from egg noodles or potatoes.
Kugelis		Lithuania	Potatoes, bacon, milk, onions, and eggs, baked in a low casserole dish.
Latka		Eastern Europe	In Ashkenazi cuisine, a potato pancake made with grated potato.
Lefse		Norway	A traditional flatbread prepared with leftover potatoes and flour.
Llapingacho		Ecuador	Fried potato patties or thick pancakes stuffed with cheese.
Lyonnaise potatoes		Lyon, France	Sliced pan-fried potatoes and thinly sliced onions, sautéed in butter with parsley.
Maluns		Grisons region of Switzerland	Consists primarily of boiled potatoes mixed with flour, then slowly fried in butter. Typically eaten with apple compote and cheese or meat.
Mashed potato		International	A dish of potatoes that have been boiled and mashed, typically prepared with milk and butter.
Meat and potato pie		Lancashire, England	A meat and potato pie has a similar filling to a Cornish pasty and differs from a meat pie in that its content is often minced and usually less than 50% meat. They are typically eaten as take-aways.
Milcao		Chile	A traditional potato pancake dish made with Chilotan potatoes. It can either be baked, or fried.
Mince and tatties		Scotland	Minced beef, onions, carrots or other root vegetables, seasoning and stock, served with boiled potatoes (mashed or whole). Some cooks add thickening agents such as flour, oatmeal or cornflour to the mince.
Munini-imo		Japan	A savory pancake made with potato flour.
Nikujaga		Japan	A stew of potatoes and onion with sweetened soy sauce.
Nilaga		Philippines	A soup made of meat (usually beef or pork), potatoes, carrots, and cabbage, occasionally also with string beans and plantains.
Okroshka		Russia	A cold soup with raw vegetables (like cucumbers, radishes and spring onions), boiled potatoes, eggs, and a cooked meat such as beef, veal, sausages, or ham with kvass and a sour cream such as smetana.
Olivier salad		Russia	Also known as Russian salad or Stolichny salad; it usually includes potatoes, diced boiled chicken (or sometimes ham or bologna sausage), eggs, brined dill pickles, carrots, green peas, and onions, mixed and dressed with mayonnaise. Variations of this salad are also popular in Eastern Europe, the Balkans, and Spain, as well as in some Asian and South American countries.
Papa a la huancaína		Peru	An appetizer of boiled yellow potatoes (similar to Yukon Gold potatoes) in a spicy, creamy sauce called huancaína sauce.
Papa rellena		Peru	Mashed potatoes formed into balls, stuffed with seasoned ground meat and spices, and deep-fried.
Papas chorreadas		Colombia	A red potato and creamy cheese dish served with onion and tomato.
Papet Vaudois		Vaud region of Switzerland	Consists primarily of boiled potatoes and leeks, accompanied with pork sausages.
Patatas bravas		Spain	Often served as a tapa in bars. It typically consists of white potatoes that have been cut into irregular shapes of about 2 centimeters, fried in oil and served warm with a sauce such as spicy tomato sauce or an aioli
Patatnik		Bulgaria	Slow-cooked grated potatoes, onions, salt and spearmint.
Pâté aux pommes de terre		France	A specialty of the Limousin and the Allier (Bourbonnais) regions in Central France, its main ingredients are potato slices and crème fraîche, which are used to fill a puff pastry crust.
Pattie		England	A battered and deep-fried disc of mashed potato, seasoned with sage and onion. It is sold in the port towns of Hartlepool, Kingston upon Hull and Liverpool.
Suan la tu dou si (酸辣土豆丝)		Northeastern China	Hot and sour shredded potato salad.
Péla		France	Prepared with fried potatoes and Reblochon cheese.
Perkedel/begedil		Indonesia, Malaysia and Singapore	Deep-fried ground potato patties filled with minced meat or vegetables.
Pickert		Germany	A flat, fried or baked potato dish that can be considered a kind of flattened dumpling or pancake
Pitepalt		Sweden	Mostly made of raw potatoes and barley flour; the dish has many varieties.
Pommes Anna		France	Sliced, layered potatoes cooked in melted butter.
Pommes dauphine		France	Sometimes referred to as dauphine potatoes, they are crisp potato puffs made by mixing mashed potatoes with savoury choux pastry, forming the mixture into dumpling shapes, and then deep-frying at 170° to 180 °C.
Pommes sarladaise		France	Often served with duck confit. Sliced potatoes seared in goose or duck fat with garlic, then steamed until soft but still crisp.
Pommes soufflées		France	Twice-fried slices of potato. First fried at 150 °C (300 °F), cooled, then fried again at 190 °C (375 °F), causing the slices to puff up.
Potatisbullar		Sweden	Smashed potatoes and eggs covered in breadcrumbs and fried.
Potato babka		Eastern Europe	A savory dish, popular especially in Poland, where it is known as babka kartoflana, and Belarus. It is made from grated potatoes, eggs, onions, and pieces of smoked, boiled or fried bacon and (especially in Poland) sausage.
Potato biscuit		International	A cookie made of potatoes.
Potato bread		Ireland	A form of bread in which potato replaces a portion of the regular wheat flour.
Potato candy		Appalachian	A rolled confection using a combination of mashed potatoes and powdered sugar to make a dough, usually filled with peanut butter.
Potato cake		International	May refer to different preparations of potatoes.
Potato chip		England	Thinly sliced potatoes that have been deep-fried or baked until crunchy.
Potato doughnut		United States	Sometimes called a Spudnut, it is a doughnut, typically sweet, made with either mashed potatoes or potato starch instead of flour.
Potato filling		Pennsylvania Dutch	Prepared with mashed potatoes, bread and additional ingredients.
Potato pancake		International	Shallow-fried pancakes of grated or ground potato, flour and egg, often flavored with grated onion or garlic and seasoning.
Potato salad		International	A dish made from boiled potatoes that comes in many versions in different regions of the world. Though called a salad, it is generally a side dish, as it usually accompanies the main course.
Potato scallops		Australia	In Australia (especially New South Wales, Queensland and the Australian Capital Territory), "potato scallops" are in the form of thin slices of potato, battered and deep-fried. Alternatively called potato cakes (Victoria and Tasmania), fritters (South Australia and New Zealand) or simply scallops.
Potato scone		United Kingdom	A regional variant of the savoury griddle scone which is especially popular in Scotland. Many variations of the recipe exist, and they generally include liberal quantities of boiled potatoes, butter and salt.
Potato skins		United States	A snack food or appetizer made with slices of half-spherical pieces of potatoes with the skin left on. They may be partially hollowed out to allow space for various toppings. The potato side is covered with toppings such as bacon, cheese, and green onions.
Potato stew		United States, Eastern Europe	A main course made with large-cut potato pieces, without skins, either boiled or baked with tomato sauce and other vegetables. Usually a vegetarian dish, although beef (Massachusetts) or pork smoked meats (Romania) may be added.
Potato waffle		United Kingdom	A potato-based savory food in a waffle-like lattice shape. They are common in the UK and Ireland and are also available in some other countries.
Potato wedges		International	A variation of French fries. As their name suggests, they are wedges of potatoes, often large and unpeeled, that are either baked or fried. They are usually seasoned with a variety of spices, commonly paprika, salt and pepper.
Potatoes O'Brien		Boston, United States	Pan-fried potatoes along with green and red bell peppers.
Potatonik		Ashkenazi Jews, Europe	May refer to two distinct potato-based dishes derived from Ashkenazi Jewish cuisine. One version is a hybrid between potato kugel and bread, containing shredded potatoes, onion, flour and leavened with yeast. Another dish, apparently unrelated but called by the same name, is essentially a very large latke meant to be cut into wedges at the table.
Poutine		Quebec, Canada	A common Canadian dish, originating in Quebec, made with French fries, topped with a light brown gravy-like sauce and cheese curds.
Poutine râpée		Acadia, Canada	A traditional Acadian dish that in its most common form consists of a boiled potato dumpling with a pork filling; it is usually prepared with a mixture of grated and mashed potato.
Raclette		Switzerland	Raclette is both a type of cheese and a Swiss dish based on heating the cheese and scraping off (racler) the melted part. The melted cheese is then eaten along with boiled potatoes, often accompanied by pickles.
Rakott krumpli		Hungary	A potato dish featuring potatoes, sour cream, smoked sausage, hard-cooked eggs, and bread crumbs that are layered and baked.
Ragda pattice		India	Patties made from boiled mashed potatoes and covered with a curry of mashed and fried peas with onions, spices and tomatoes.
Rappie pie		Canada	A casserole-like dish traditionally formed by grating potatoes, then squeezing them through cheesecloth, upon which other ingredients are added.
Raspeball		Norway, Germany	A dumpling prepared with grated potato, salt and flour, and often barley.
Reibekuchen		Germany	Potato fritters that are common in many areas of Germany.
Rewena bread		New Zealand	A traditional Māori (Polynesian) sourdough potato bread.
Rösti		Switzerland	Consists primarily of grated potatoes, with a number of additional ingredients sometimes added.
Rumbledethumps		Scotland	A traditional dish from the Scottish Borders. The main ingredients are potato, cabbage and onion.
Salchipapa		Latin America	A fast food dish commonly consumed as street food throughout Latin America, it typically consists of thinly sliced pan-fried beef sausages and French fries, mixed together with a savory coleslaw on the side.
Salt potatoes		Syracuse, New York, United States	As the potatoes cook, the salty water forms a crust on the skin and seals the potatoes so they never taste waterlogged. The potatoes have a unique texture closer to fluffy baked potatoes, only creamier.
Samosa		Indian subcontinent	A fast food of the Indian subcontinent made with wheat flour dough and potatoes as a main ingredient, sometimes with other vegetables.
Schupfnudel		Southern Germany, Austria	A dumpling or thick noodle in southern German and Austrian cuisine; often served as a savory dish with sauerkraut but also in sweet dishes in combination with apple sauce.
Silesian dumplings		Poland	In Polish: kluski śląskié. Made of boiled and then mashed potatoes (moderately cooled, but still warm), potato flour, an egg (optional) and a dash of salt.
Sjömansbiff		Sweden	Scandinavian dish of beef, onions and potatoes cooked in beer, usually a porter.
Skomakarlåda		Sweden	Composed of a slice of beef served with gravy and mashed potatoes and typically garnished with diced bacon and chopped pieces of leek.
Slaps		England	Sliced potatoes stacked on top of each other and baked, then fried, sometimes containing root vegetables and topped with cinnamon.
Spanish omelette		Spain	Potato and egg fried in olive oil (also called a tortilla).
Spice bag		Ireland	French fries/chips, chicken strips, peppers and spices.
Stamppot		Netherlands	Potatoes mashed with vegetables and sausage or other stewed meats.
Steak frites		France and Belgium	Pan-fried steak paired with deep-fried potatoes (French fries).
Stegt flæsk		Denmark	Fried bacon served with potatoes and a parsley sauce (med persillesovs).
Stoemp		Belgium	A Brussels variant of the stamppot dish in the cuisine of Belgium and the Netherlands. It consists of pureed or mashed potatoes and other root vegetables and can also include cream, bacon, onion or shallot, herbs, and spices.
Stovies		Scotland	A stew containing potatoes with variations containing onion, leftover roast beef, corned beef, mince or other sorts of meat.
Sweetened potato casserole		Finland	A Christmas dish of puréed potatoes mixed with wheat flour.
Kaju kishmish potato wedges		India	Pan-fried potato wedges coated with peanut–sesame spice mix, cashews, and raisins.
Szałot		Silesia	Potato salad made with carrots, peas, ham, various sausages, pickled fish, and boiled eggs, with olive oil or mayonnaise.
Tartiflette		Haute-Savoie, France	Potatoes, Reblochon cheese, lardons and onions.
Tashmijab		Svaneti, Georgia	A variant of mashed potatoes with sulguni cheese.
Tater Tots		United States	Potato pieces industrially formed into small cylinders and deep-fried (similar to hash browns).
Tombet		Spain	Sliced potatoes, eggplant, and red bell peppers previously fried in olive oil, served in a low-sided dish.
Tornado potato		South Korea	Spiral-cut potatoes, deep-fried until crisp.
Trinxat		Catalonia, Spain	A dish of potatoes, cabbage, and pork. In the image, the trinxat is on the right.
Truffade		France	A thick pancake of slowly cooked, thinly sliced potatoes that are then mixed with strips of tome fraîche.
Woolton pie		England	One of several dishes commended by the British Ministry in Food World War II to provide a nutritional diet despite food shortages and rationing of meat.
Xogoi momo		Tibet	Balls of breaded, mashed potato and dough shaped with minced meat filling.
Zippuli		Italy	Fried potato dough.

== See also ==
- Potato cooking
- Potato processing industry
- List of potato cultivars
- List of sweet potato dishes
- List of vegetable dishes

== Bibliography ==
- Buonassisi, Vincenzo (1985). Il nuovo codice della pasta. Rizzoli. ISBN 8817240451.
