= Grands-pères =

Traditional pastry in Québécois cuisine

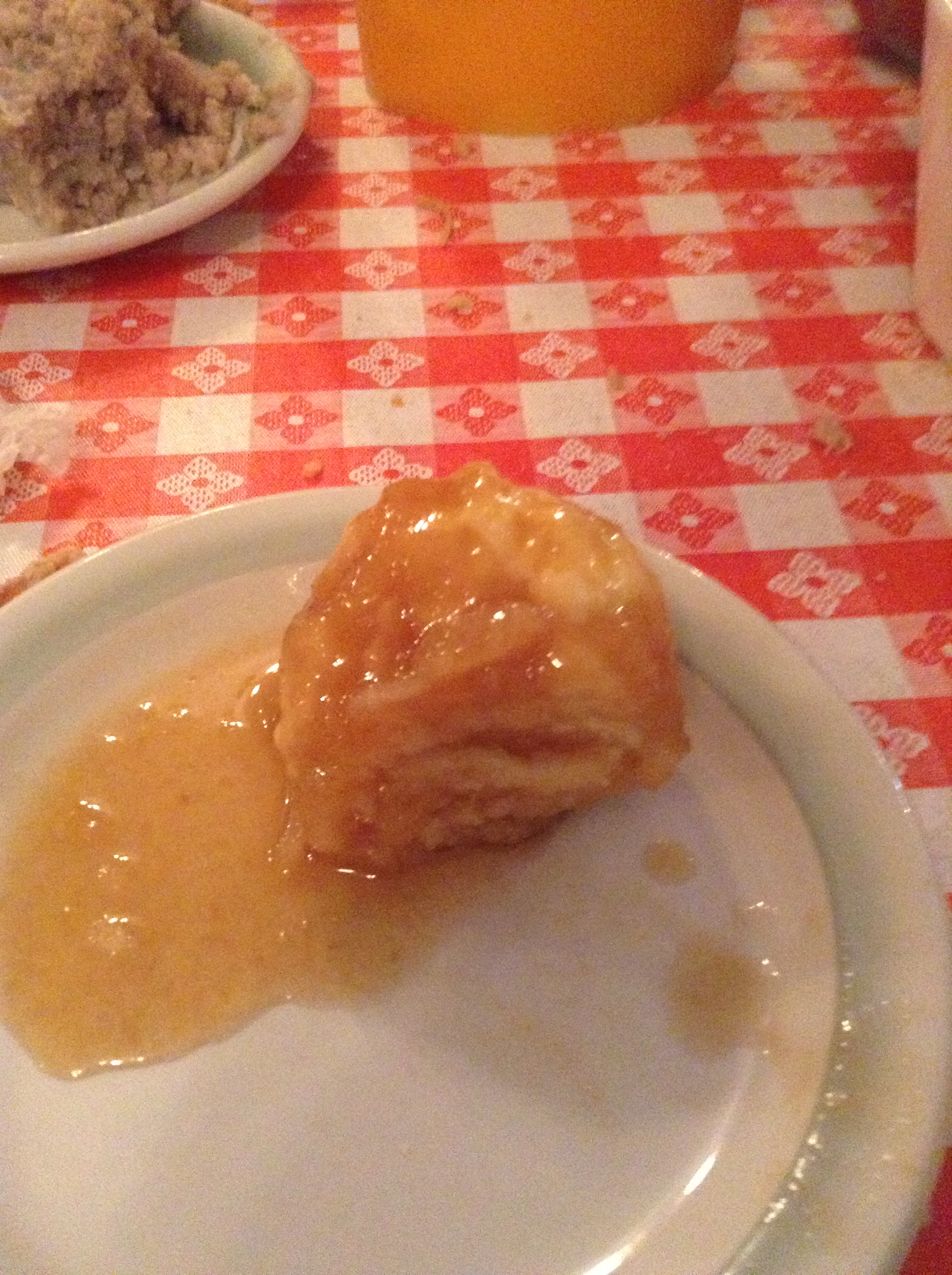
Grand-père au sirop d'érable.

Grand-pères, grand-pères au sirop d'érable or grand-pères dans le sirop d'érable is a traditional dumpling based dessert in Québécois and Acadian cuisine. The term pépère is also used to describe this dish in some regions of Quebec like Beauce. This dumpling is commonly served during "le temps des sucres" in sugar shacks.

== Description ==
Grand-pères are dumplings which are more or less in the shape of a ball and that created out of dough made from flour, baking powder, butter, milk and sugar. Grand-pères must be put in boiling maple syrup so that they are infused with its flavour. They are served with the boiled maple syrup and often with ice cream. Brown sugar can sometimes replace the maple syrup and vanilla can sometimes be added.

== Variants ==
This dessert has several variations, such as grand-pères stuffed with apples, raspberries, strawberries, blueberries, pecans or even caramel. The maple syrup can also be replaced with brown sugar.

== Origin ==
This dessert is said to be of Acadian origin and that its current name dates back from when it arrived in Quebec. The name "grand-père" is assumed to have been given to this dish either because grandfathers could easily eat this dish despite having lost their teeth, because the ball resembled an elderly face or because the dish was prepared by grandfathers who were relegated the easy task of stirring maple syrup in the cauldron.

== See also ==
- Cuisine of Quebec
- Acadian cuisine
- Maple syrup
- Sugar shack
