= Betteraves marinées =

Quebecois dish

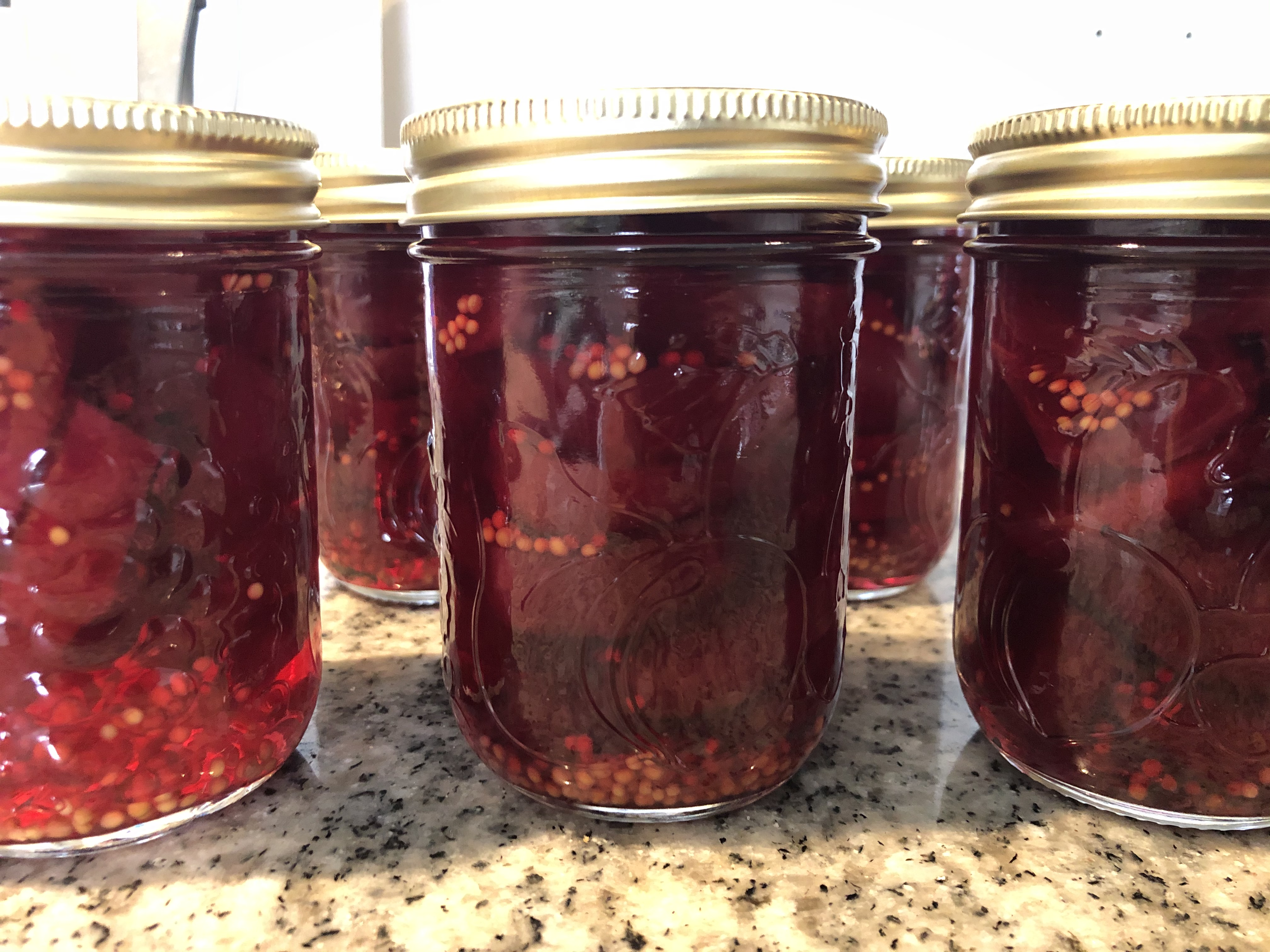
Betteraves marinées are beets preserved in an acidic and sugary mixture.

Betteraves marinées are a recipe which dates back to when families in French-speaking parts of Canada would need to preserve food for the winter. The beets are cut up, boiled and put in jars. Then, they are coated in a recently sterilised mix of vinegar, mustard seeds, beet water and sugar, and the jar is quickly closed to ensure air cannot enter or leave the jar. The beets can be preserved this way for years. The betteraves marinées are best eaten cold.

== See also ==
- Cuisine of Quebec
- Acadian cuisine
- Canadian cuisine
