= Fricot =

Traditional Acadian stew

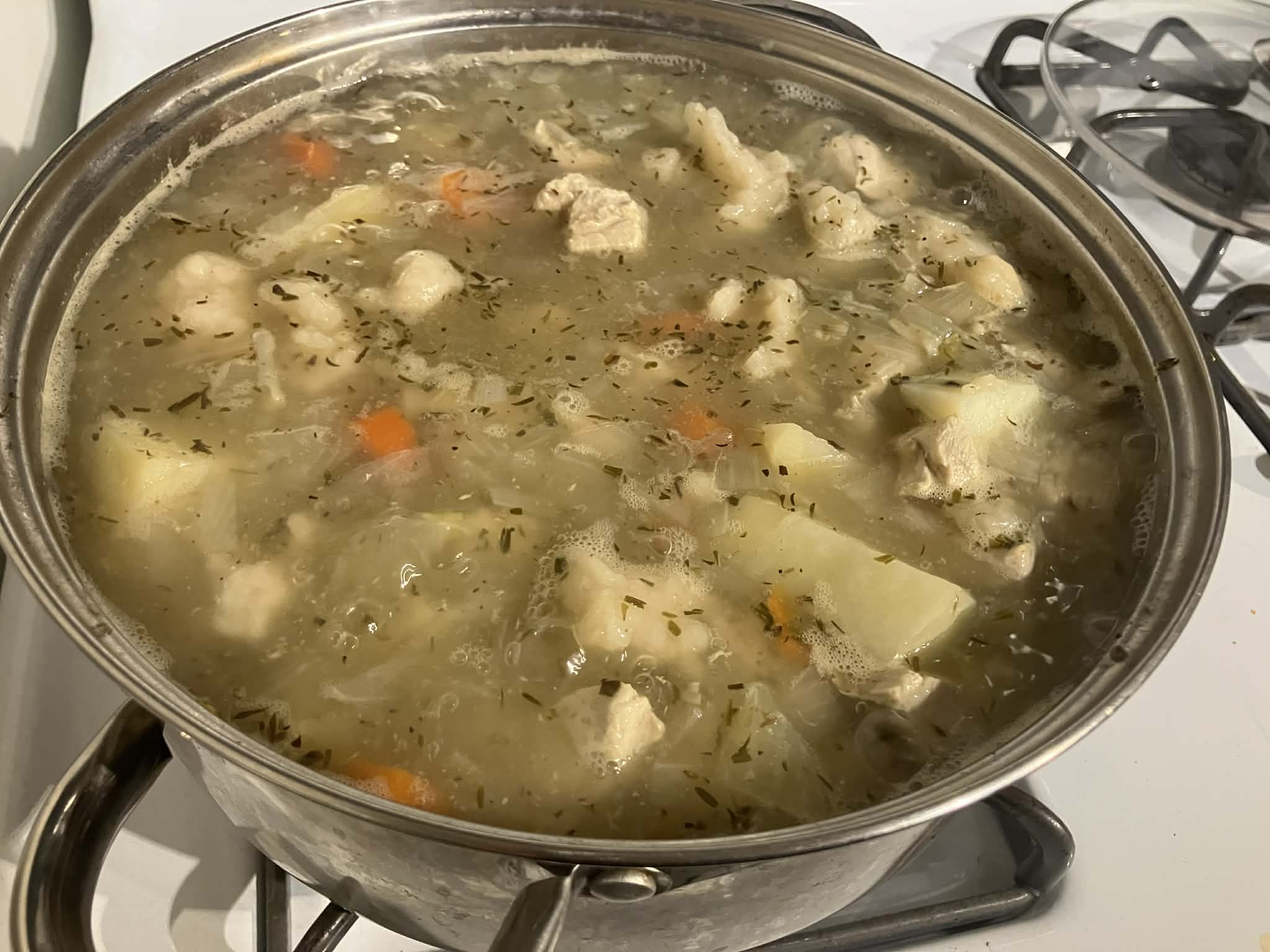
- Fricot
- Type: Stew
- Place of origin: Canada
- Region or state: Acadia, Maritime provinces
- Main ingredients: Meat (chicken, clams, rabbit, beef or pork), potatoes, onions, dumplings

Fricot is an Acadian dish. It is a stew containing meat (chicken), potatoes, onions, carrots, summer savoury, and sometimes dumplings. It is such an important part of Acadian food culture that the call to eat in Acadian French is "Au fricot!"

== See also ==
- Canadian cuisine
- List of stews
