= Batatas a murro =

Portuguese potato dish

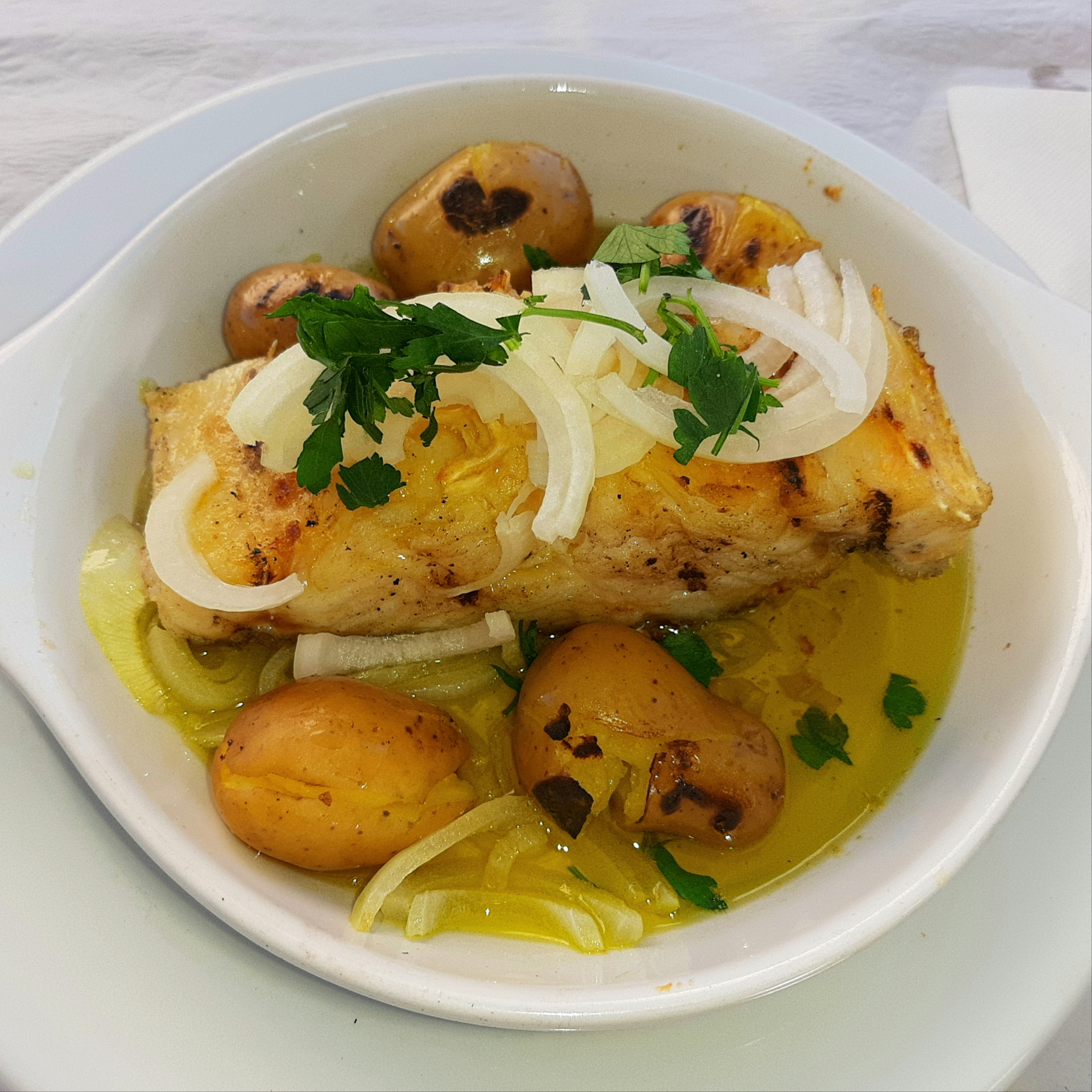
- Roasted cod with batatas a murro.
- Alternative names: Batatas ao murro
- Place of origin: Portugal
- Main ingredients: Potato, olive oil and salt

Batatas a murro (Portuguese: [bɐˈtatɐʃ ɐ ˈmuʁu], also called batatas ao murro in Brazil, literally "punched potatoes") is a Portuguese recipe and cooking technique using new potatoes that are lightly smashed.

The name "batatas a murro" ("punched potatoes") comes from the light blow (punch) given to the potato after it is boiled or roasted, which opens it and slightly crushes it, allowing it to absorb the olive oil better. New potatoes with their skins on are used—that is, small potatoes harvested before full maturity. Often, after boiling, they are roasted to make the skin even crispier.

Portuguese smashed potatoes are served alongside roasted cod in a traditional Portuguese dish.

== See also ==
- List of potato dishes
- Polvo à lagareiro
