= Game chips =

Fried potato slices served with roast game birds

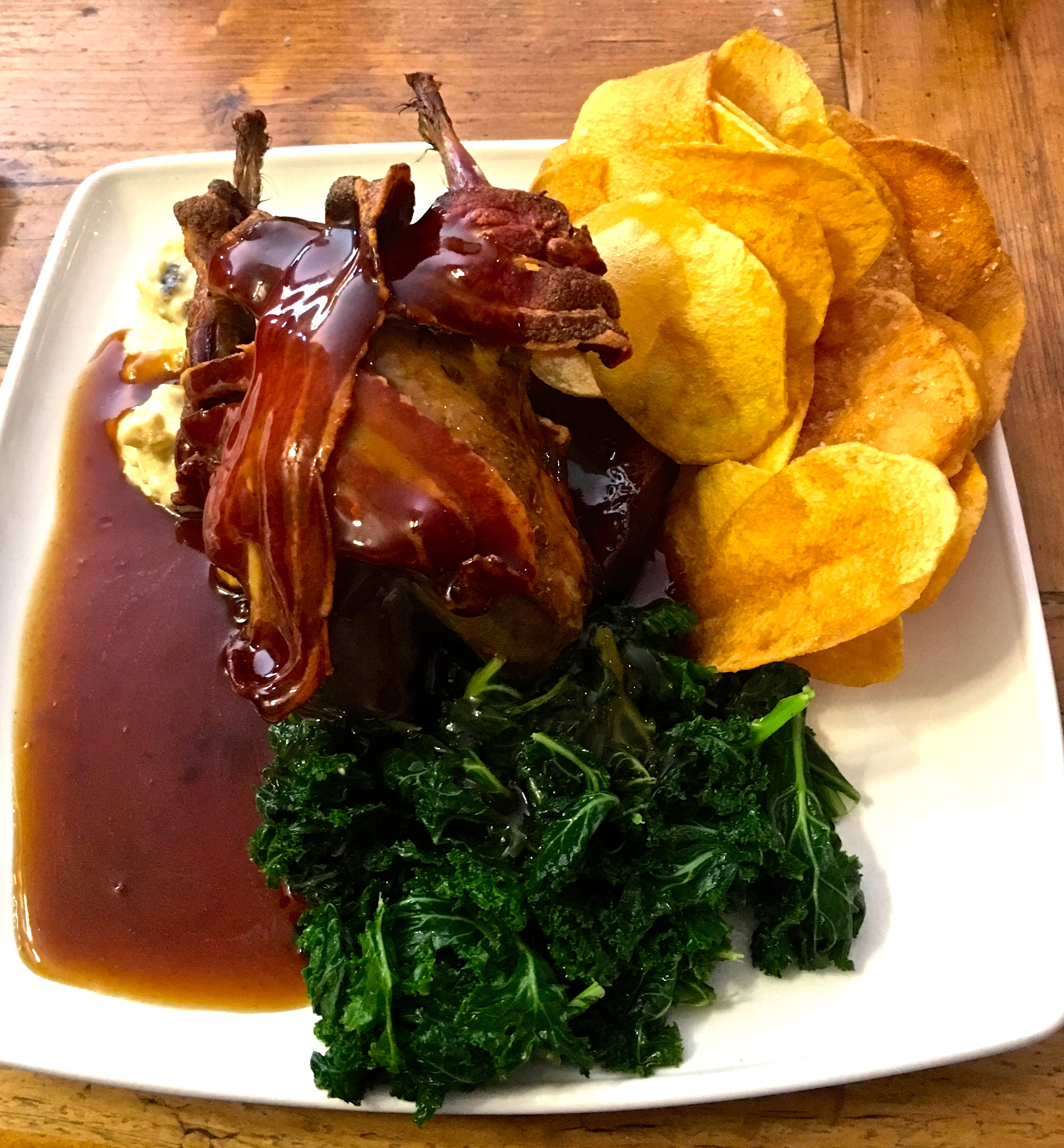
Grouse served with kale and game chips

Game chips are a traditional British accompaniment to roast gamebirds, such as pheasant, grouse, partridge and quail. They are thin slices of potato (sometimes dusted with flour; often crinkle-cut), deep-fried, and may be served hot or cold. They are different from chips (American English: French fries), which are square-cut, deep-fried, and generally eaten hot; from crisps (American English: potato chips), which are thin (often very thin) slices either deep-fried or baked, and eaten cold; and from sauté potatoes, which are medium-thick slices, shallow-fried, and eaten hot. They date back to at least 1903, when a recipe was published by Escoffier.

== See also ==
- List of potato dishes
