= Rappie pie =

Traditional Acadian dish

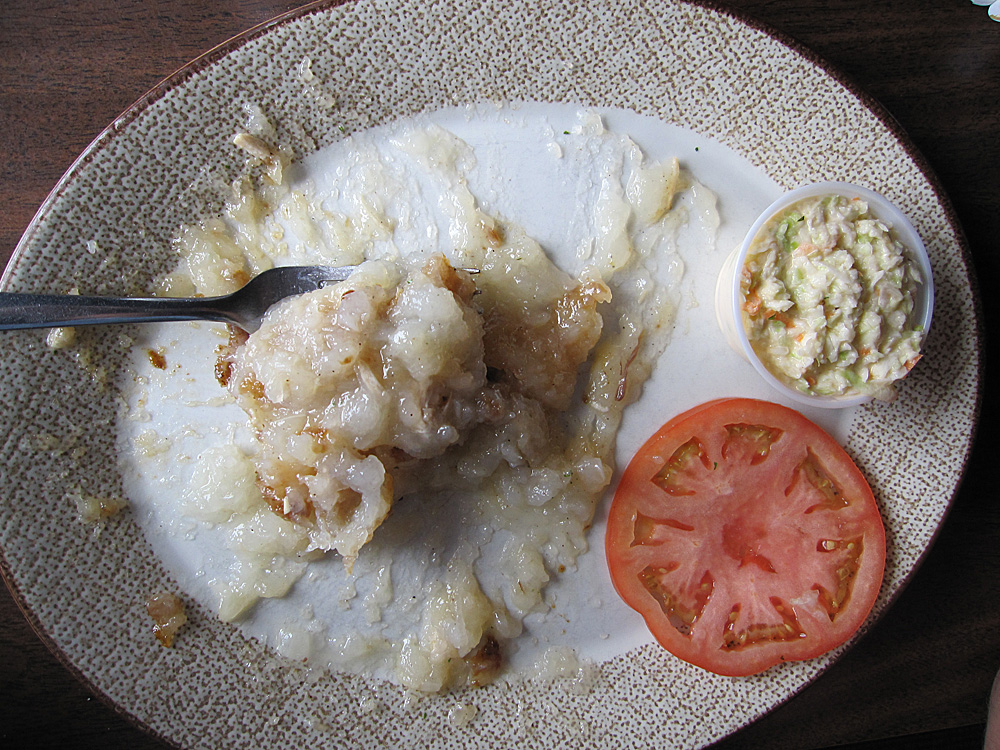
- A serving of rappie pie, on a plate with tomato and dressing
- Alternative names: Rapure pie, râpure
- Place of origin: Canada
- Region or state: Nova Scotia, Prince Edward Island, New Brunswick
- Main ingredients: Potatoes, broth (chicken, pork or seafood), meat, onions

Rappie pie is a traditional Acadian dish from southwest Nova Scotia, New Brunswick and areas of Prince Edward Island. It is sometimes referred to as rapure pie, râpée, or râpure. Its name is derived from the French patates râpées meaning 'grated potatoes'. It is a casserole-like dish formed by grating potatoes, then squeezing them through cheesecloth to remove some of the water from the potato solids. The removed liquid is replaced by adding hot broth made from chicken, pork or seafood along with meat and onions, and layering additional grated potatoes over the top. Common meat fillings include beef, chicken, or bar clams.

== History ==
It is thought that rappie pie has its origins in the Acadian Expulsion, among Acadians who lived out their exile in Massachusetts. This opportunity to meet and interact with other immigrant groups would naturally encourage a sharing of cultural recipes. It may have been German or Swiss immigrants who taught the Acadians their technique for using grated potatoes in their recipes, but whoever it was, this proved to be an important tip for those that returned to Nova Scotia and the Maritimes when the expulsion was lifted. When they returned, they found that their fertile land had been given to Loyalist New Englanders lured north by the promise of farmland. The harsh, rocky land that remained was excellent for growing potatoes, if little else, so the Acadians used them to fill out dishes made with what game was available.

== See also ==
- Gratin, the French cuisine cooking technique
- Rösti, the national Swiss dish of shredded potatoes
- Hotdish, the Northern Midwestern American casserole
- Pommes boulangère, similar dish made with sliced potatoes
- List of casserole dishes
