= Acadia (region) =

Region in Canada

Acadia Acadie
- Region
- Flag

- Approximate map of the most commonly accepted definition of Acadia
- Country: Canada
- Provinces: New Brunswick, Nova Scotia, Prince Edward Island
- Cities: Bathurst, Caraquet, Campbellton, Clare, Dieppe, Shediac, Cap-Pelé, Memramcook, Edmundston, Moncton, Tracadie-Sheila, Bouctouche, Madawaska, Van Buren, Matapédia, Carleton-sur-Mer, Bonaventure, Cap-aux-Meules, Havre-Saint-Pierre

Area
  - Total: 30,000 ha (74,000 acres)

Population (2021)
  - Total: 300,000
  - Density: 1,000/km^{2} (2,600/sq mi)
- Demonym: Acadian

Acadia is a North American cultural region in the Maritime provinces of Canada where approximately 300,000 French-speaking Acadians live. The region lacks clear or formal borders; it is usually considered to be the north and east of New Brunswick as well as many localities in Prince Edward Island and Nova Scotia. Some also include a few localities in Quebec and/or Maine.

An historical or operational definition of Acadia can also refer to the entire three Maritime provinces or those province's French-speakers even in now English-speaking majority areas such as Halifax. Although Newfoundland was not part of the original Acadia, the historic dispersal of Acadians to Newfoundland and modern cultural connections tying French-speaking Newfoundlanders with those in the Maritimes can also include Newfoundland or Newfoundland and Labrador in these definitions. For example, Le Téléjournal Acadie is the French-language television newscast for all Atlantic Canada including reports from all four provinces.

The present-day region of Acadia's name echoes that of the historic colony of Acadia, a colony of New France which covered the Maritimes, and that was inhabited by Acadians until the Expulsion of the Acadians during the French and Indian War. A few Acadians managed to escape the deportation by fleeing to the most rural parts of the old territory and re-settling there, which is mostly the North and East of New Brunswick today. Their descendants came to dominate these areas, leading to the emergence of modern-day Acadia.

Acadia has always been a poor region for a variety of reasons. For example, after the British conquest, a test oath was put in place, preventing Catholics from voting or being a candidate. The Acadians were also firmly opposed to the Confederation of Canada, which would severely affect the local economy. Furthermore, the lands of Acadia are not very fertile, making them a poor choice for agriculture.

== Geology and topography ==
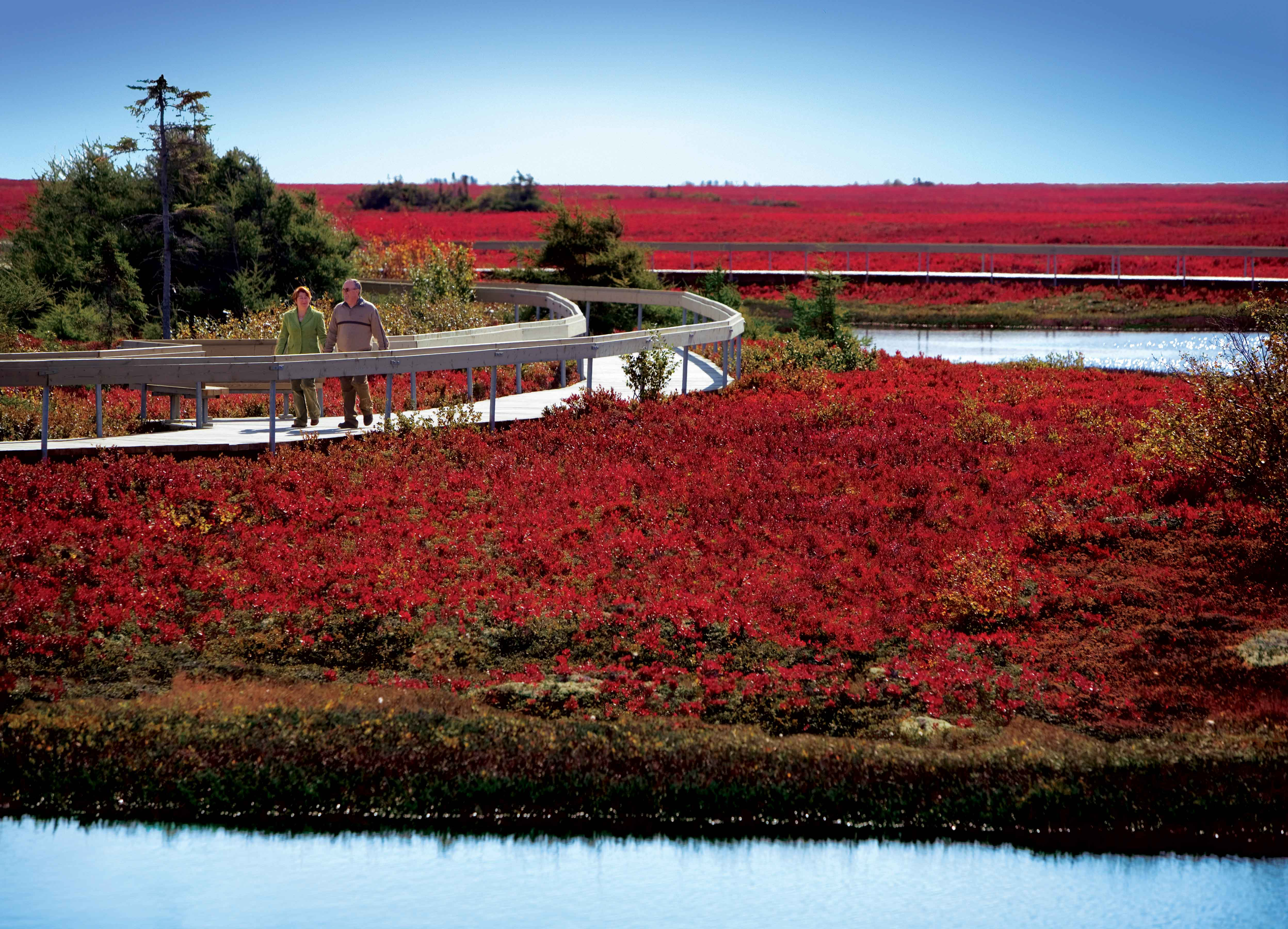
The Miscou plains in fall.

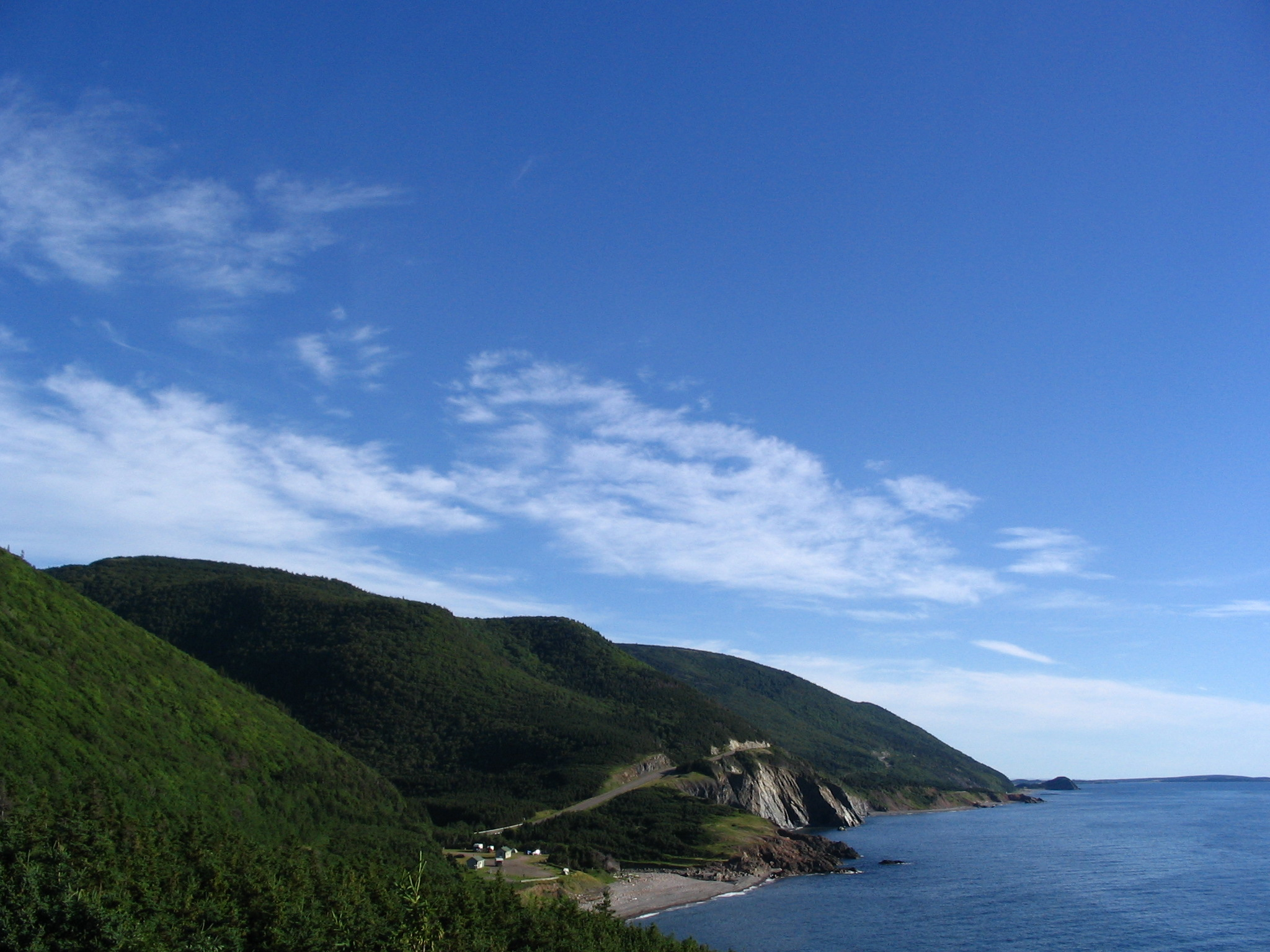
The Cabot Trail in the Cape Breton Highlands National Park.

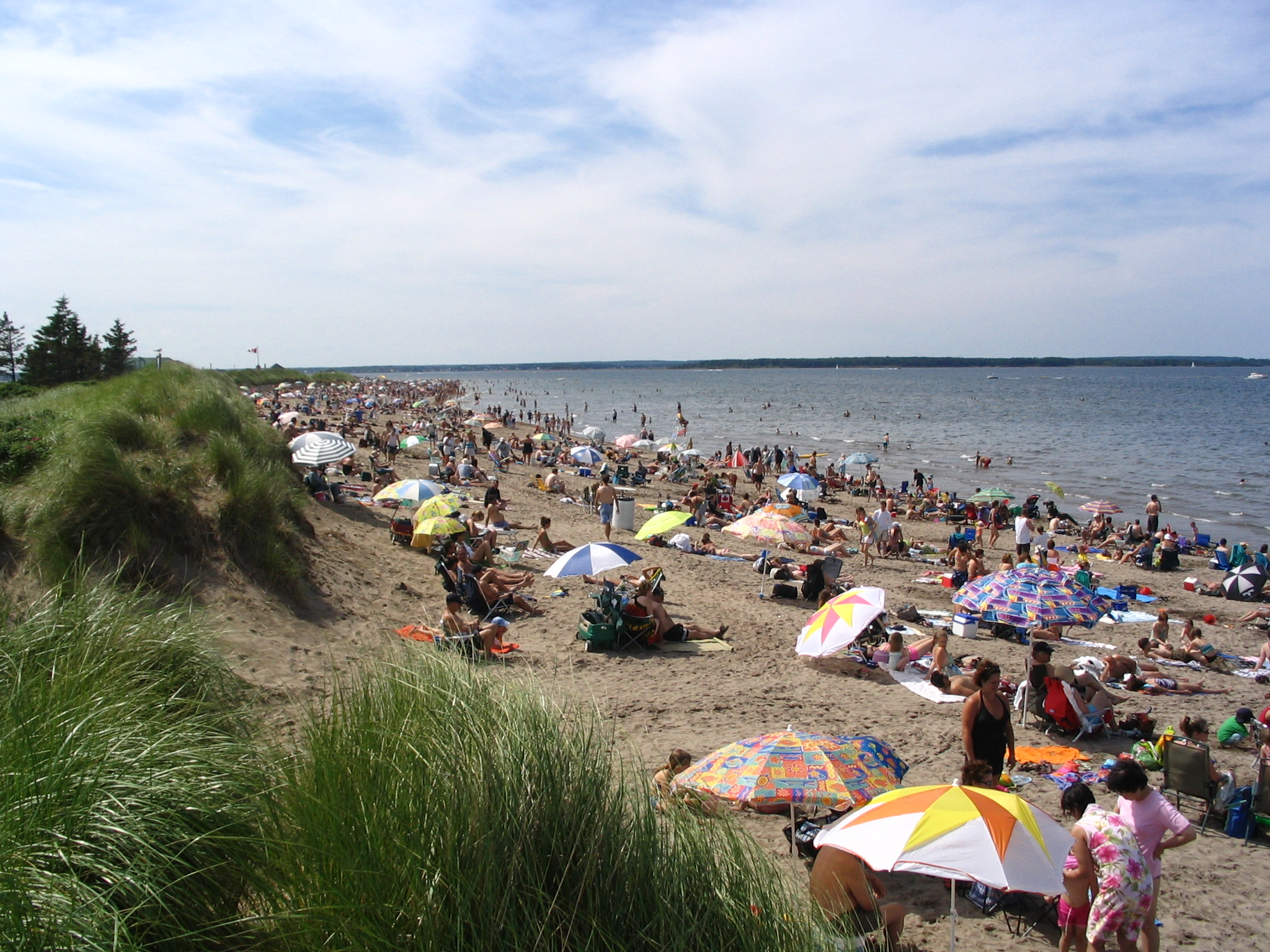
Parlee Beach at Pointe-du-Chêne near Shediac.

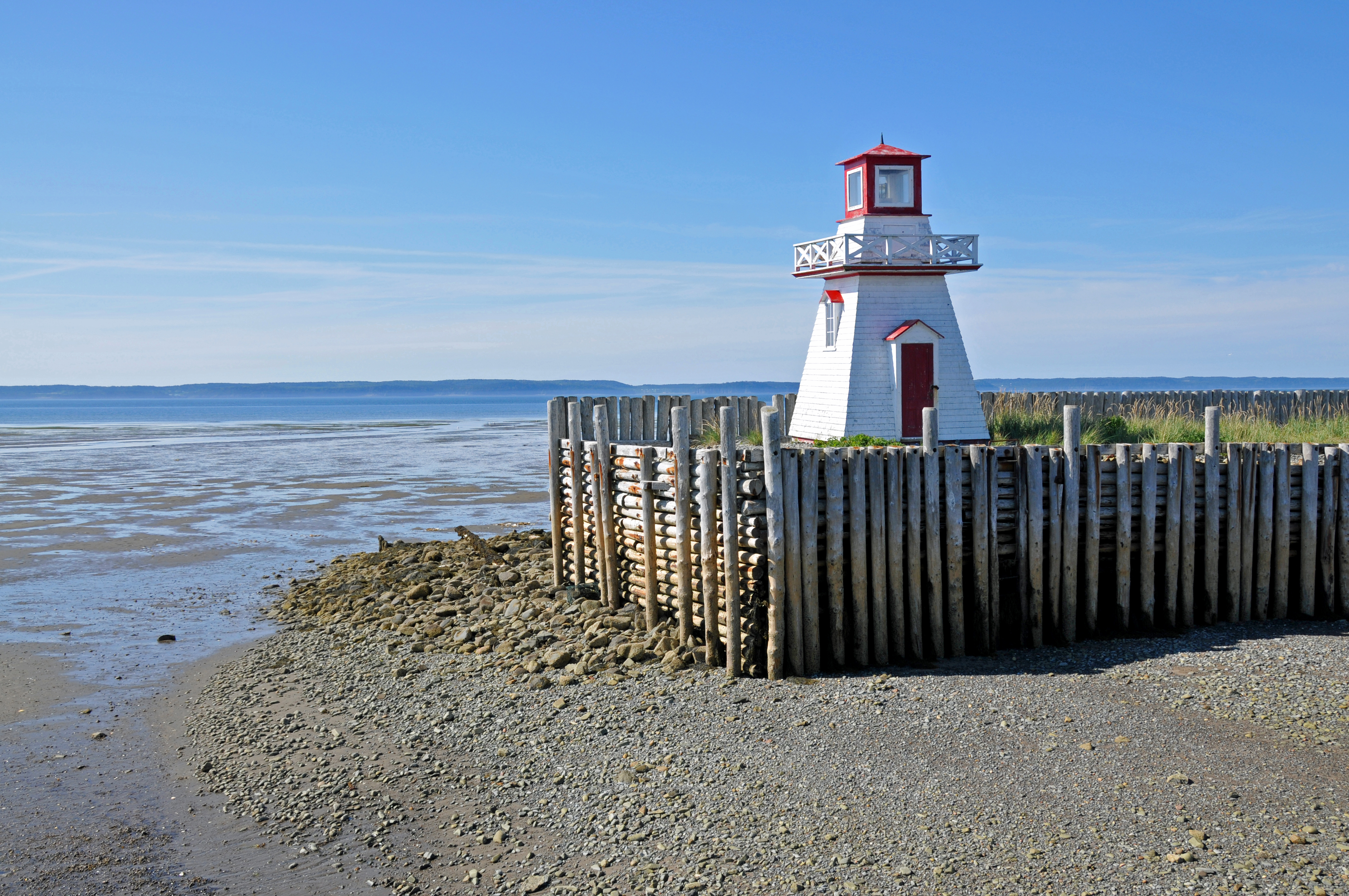
The Anse-des-Belliveau lighthouse in Clare.

Acadia's main rivers are the Restigouche and Nepisiguit rivers which flow into the Chaleur Bay, the Miramichi River which flows into the Gulf of St. Lawrence, and the Petitcodiac and Saint John rivers which flow into the Bay of Fundy. Acadia has many small lakes and wetlands. Wetlands are particularly common on the Acadian Peninsula and in Kent County. Most of Acadia is located at the northern end of the Appalachians, and this is where its highest peak Mount Carleton stands at 817 metres high. However, other massifs are in Acadia, notably the Cape Breton Plateau whose highest peak, White Butte, has an altitude of 532 metres.

The rocks are generally Paleozoic in age (543 to 250 million years old), but there are Precambrian (4.5 billion to 542 million years old) rocks in Cheticamp and Mesozoic (251 to 65.5 million years old) rocks on the seafloor near Clare. Most of the area is composed of sedimentary rocks but there are volcanic rocks in the vicinity of Bathurst, Campbellton and Grand Falls, as well as intrusive rocks in Bathurst, Belledune and Argyle, while in Cheticamp there is a mix of sedimentary, volcanic, intrusive and metamorphic rocks.

Earthquakes are weak and rare in Acadia, though in NB earthquakes of magnitude greater than 5.0 can occur. The Grand Banks 1929 earthquake, with a magnitude of 7.2, caused the only Acadian tsunami ever witnessed.

== Economy ==
Since 1960s, Acadia's economic situation has improved compared to the Canadian average because of increased access to post-secondary education, increased participation in the labor market, more entrepreneurialism, more well-paid public service jobs, and the rise of the welfare state (income transfers represent 20% of total income for Acadians compared to 16% for maritime anglophones). Some organisations offer support to entrepreneurs, like the Atlantic Canada Opportunities Agency.

Despite this progress, a large development gap persists between Acadia and the Canadian average. This can be explained in part by the smaller workforce and the higher unemployment rate. Several regions of Acadia have a lot of seasonal employment because of their main industry (ex. fishing, forestry, agri-food, etc...), so high unemployment during certains parts of the year are the norm there, and many rely on employment insurance. There is strong opposition to the reform of some government programs, particularly in the fishing sector, because employment insurance allows workers to provide for their needs during periods of inactivity.

== Cuisine ==
Acadian cuisine evolved from 16th century French cuisine and has also been influenced by the cuisine of French Canadians, Native Americans, Americans and even Germans. There exist regional dishes, like ploye, popular in Madawaska, or poutine râpée, popular around Moncton. Most of the ingredients used were available to the Acadians locally, while some originate from old trade routes with the West Indies and Brazil, such as raisins, rice, brown sugar and molasses. In Acadian cuisine, potatoes are the staple food and fish and seafood are very popular.

== See also ==
- Acadia
- Deportation of the Acadians
- Canada (New France)
- List of proposed provinces and territories of Canada
- Maritime Peninsula
