= Conejo en salmorejo =

Rabbit meat dish from the Canary Islands

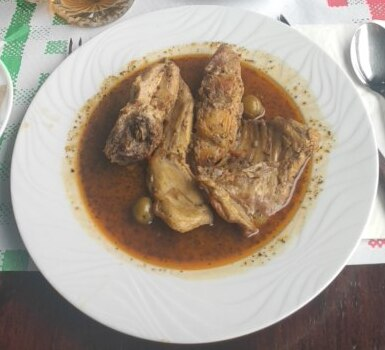
- Conejo en salmorejo, Estrellas restaurant, Santa Cruz de Tenerife
- Course: main
- Place of origin: Spain
- Region or state: Canary Islands
- Associated cuisine: Spanish cuisine
- Serving temperature: hot
- Main ingredients: rabbit meat

Conejo en salmorejo (rabbit in Canarian marinade) is a meat dish from the Canary Islands. The main ingredient is rabbit meat that is marinated, then sautéed and finally cooked in the marinade until done.

In addition to the meat the rabbit's liver is often used as well. Base of the marinade are white wine (usually dry), olive oil and often vinegar that are mixed with garlic, bayleaf, bell peppers and thyme. Additional ingredients are used according to personal taste. As side dishes, usually papas arrugadas are served, unskinned small potatoes that are cooked in salty water. Alternative side dishes like rice, bread or french fries are not uncommon.

Conejo en salmorejo has a high awareness level on the Canary islands and is named a signature dish of the Canarian cuisine. The origin of the dish is unclear, some sources trace it to Aragon. The Andalucian vegetable soup salmorejo is not related.
