= Polvo à lagareiro =

Portuguese octopus dish

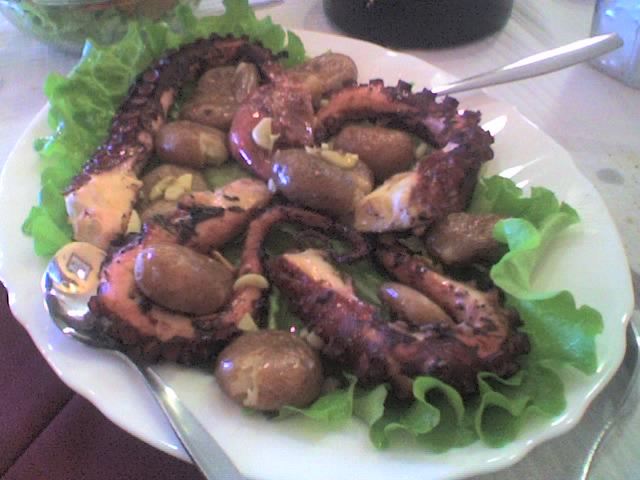
- Polvo à lagareiro with batatas a murro and lettuce.
- Place of origin: Portugal
- Main ingredients: Octopus, batatas a murro, olive oil, olives, grelos, and garlic

Polvo à Lagareiro is a Portuguese dish based on octopus, olive oil, potatoes (batatas a murro), grelos and garlic. Its origin is uncertain though it is a common dish in Trás-os-Montes Province. It is often served on Christmas Eve.

The term lagareiro refers to someone who works in an olive oil mill (lagar) in the production of olive oil. It is used in this context because of the abundant amount of olive oil poured over the octopus.

== See also ==
- Batatas a murro
