= Aloo gobhi =

Curry dish with cauliflower and potatoes

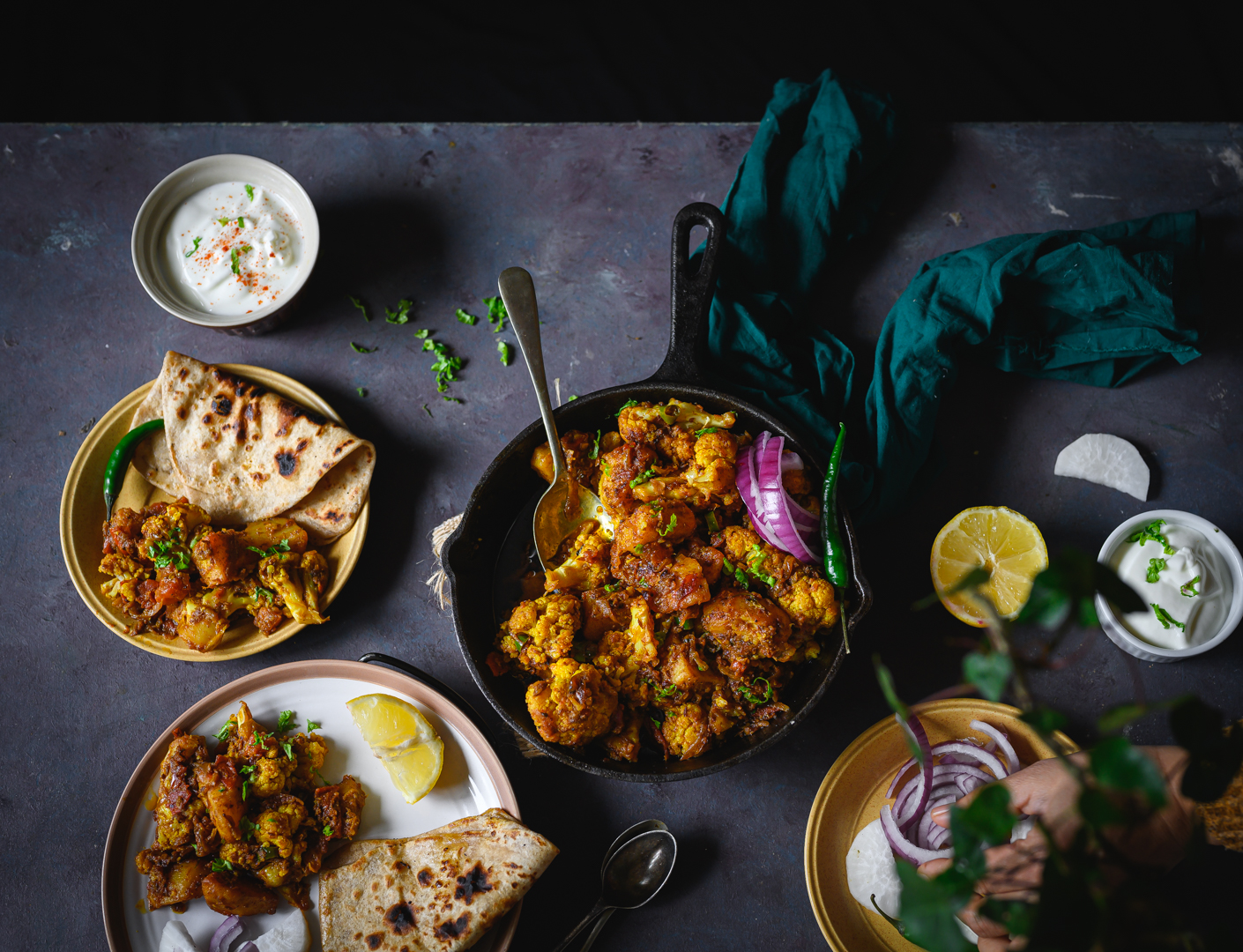
- Alternative names: Alu gobi, aloo gobi, alu gobhi, alu kopi, alu khobi
- Type: Curry
- Course: Main
- Place of origin: Indian subcontinent
- Region or state: Indian subcontinent
- Serving temperature: Hot
- Main ingredients: Potatoes, cauliflower, Indian spices (turmeric)

Aloo gobhi, aloo gobi or alu gobhi (pronounced [äːluː goːbʱiː]) is a vegetarian dish from the Indian subcontinent made with potatoes (aloo), cauliflower (gobhi), and Indian spices. It is popular in Indian cuisine. It is yellowish in color due to the use of turmeric, and occasionally contains black cumin and curry leaves. Other common ingredients include garlic, ginger, onion, coriander stalks, tomato, peas, black pepper, asafoetida and cumin. There are a number of variations and similar dishes.

A traditional dish with origins in Northern India, it is very popular throughout the country and is also well known in the cuisines of Nepal, Bengal and Pakistan.

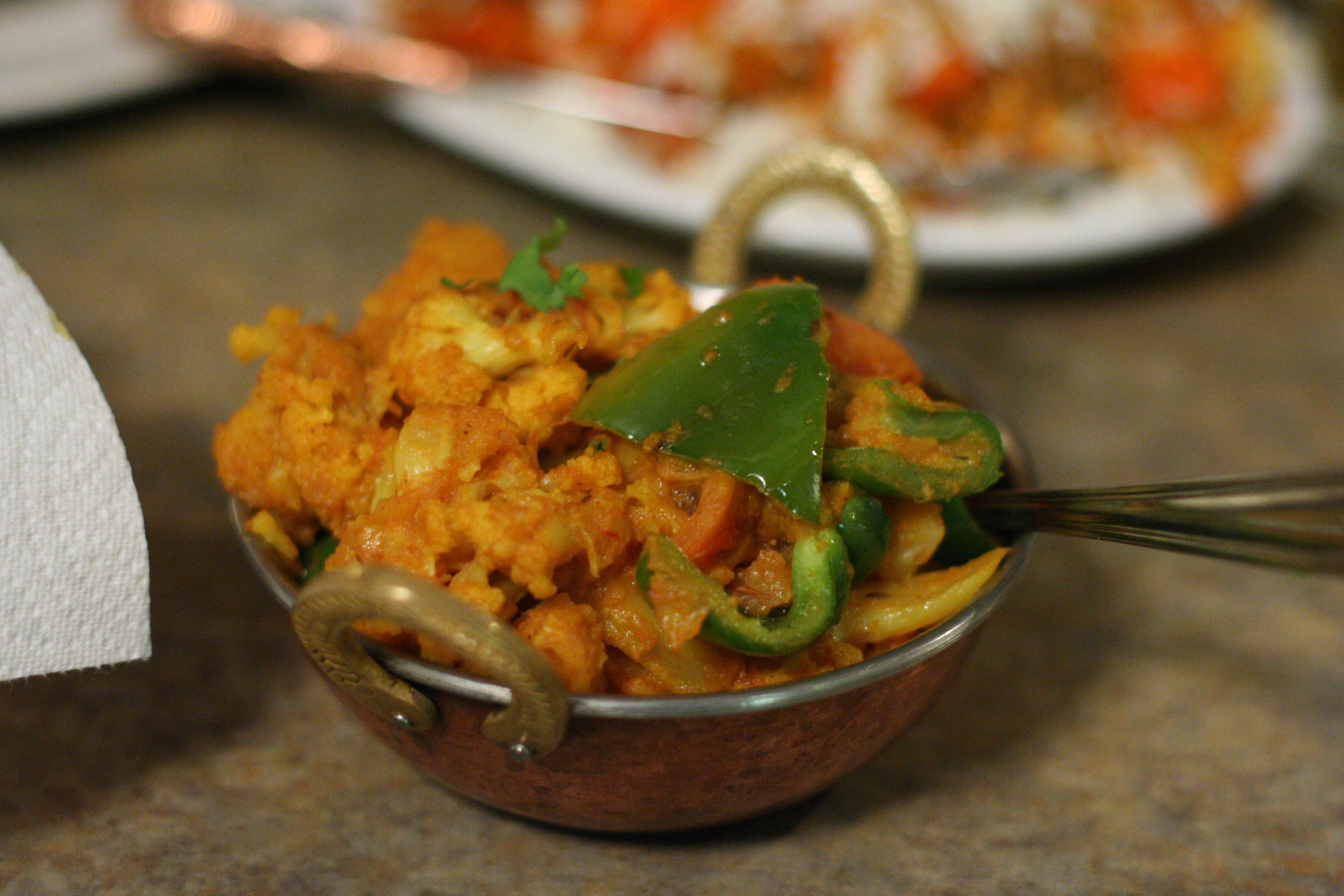

== See also ==
- Aloo gosht
- Bombay potatoes
- List of potato dishes
