= Gefillde =

Potato-based dish

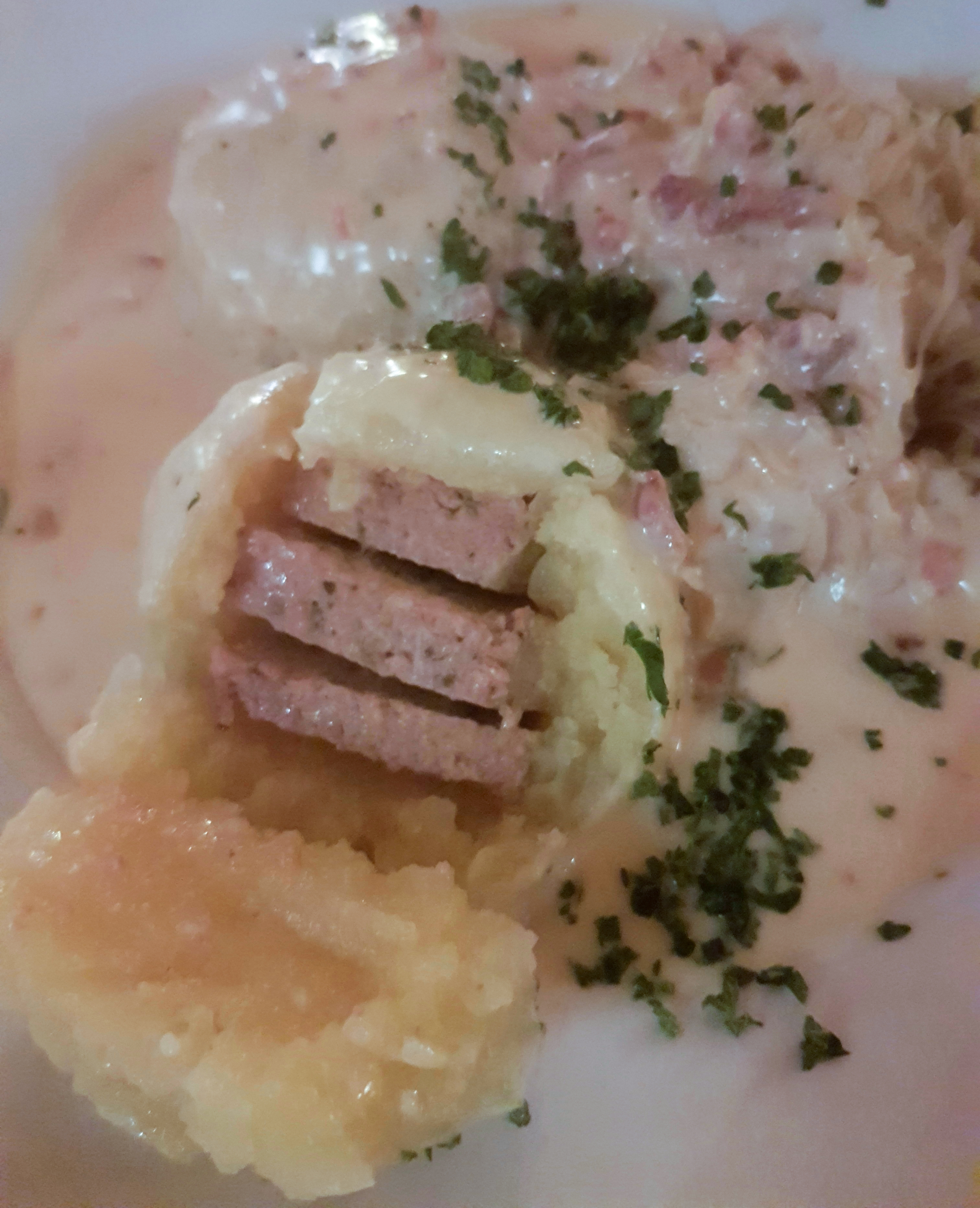
- Alternative names: Gefillde Knepp or Gefillte Klees
- Type: potato dish
- Place of origin: Germany and France
- Region or state: Rhineland-Palatinate, Saarland and Alsace
- Main ingredients: potato, beef, pork, liver sausage; sometimes bread roll, onion, parsley, or leek

Gefillde are filled raspeballs from raw and cooked potatoes, which are known as specialities in South-West Germany and Alsace. This dish is one of the most popular dishes in Saarland.

The filling of the raspeball can be pork, beef or liver sausage. Other ingredients can be soaked bread rolls, cut onion, persil and leek. Traditionally the food is served with sauerkraut and a bacon-cream-sauce in a deep plate.
