= Fondant potatoes =

Potato shaped and cooked in butter and stock

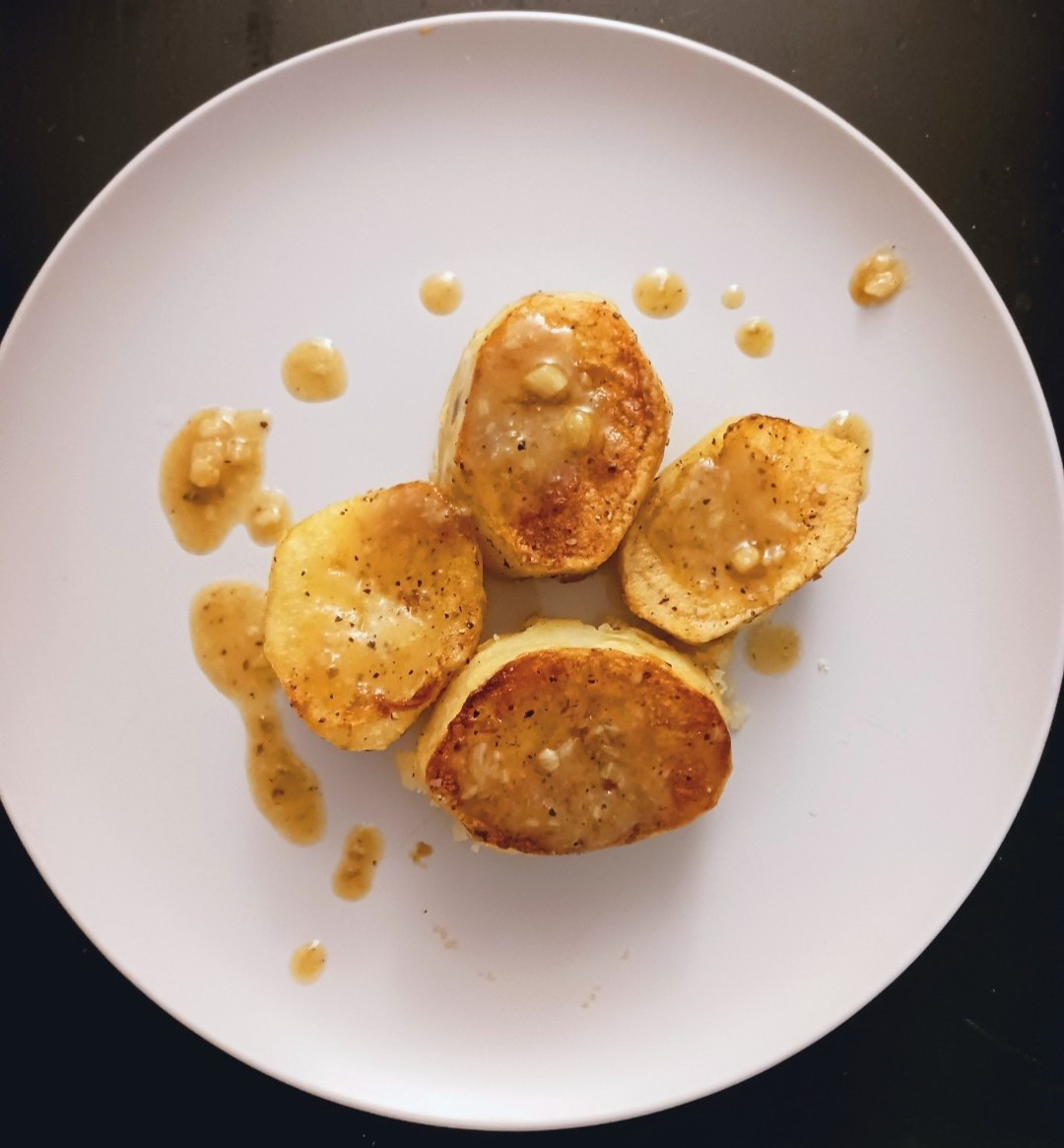
- Plate of fondant potatoes with pan sauce
- Type: Side dish
- Place of origin: France
- Main ingredients: Potato, butter, stock

Fondant potatoes, or pommes fondantes (French for 'melting potatoes'), is a method of preparing potatoes that involves cutting them into cylinders, browning the ends, and slowly simmering in butter and stock.

== Gallery ==
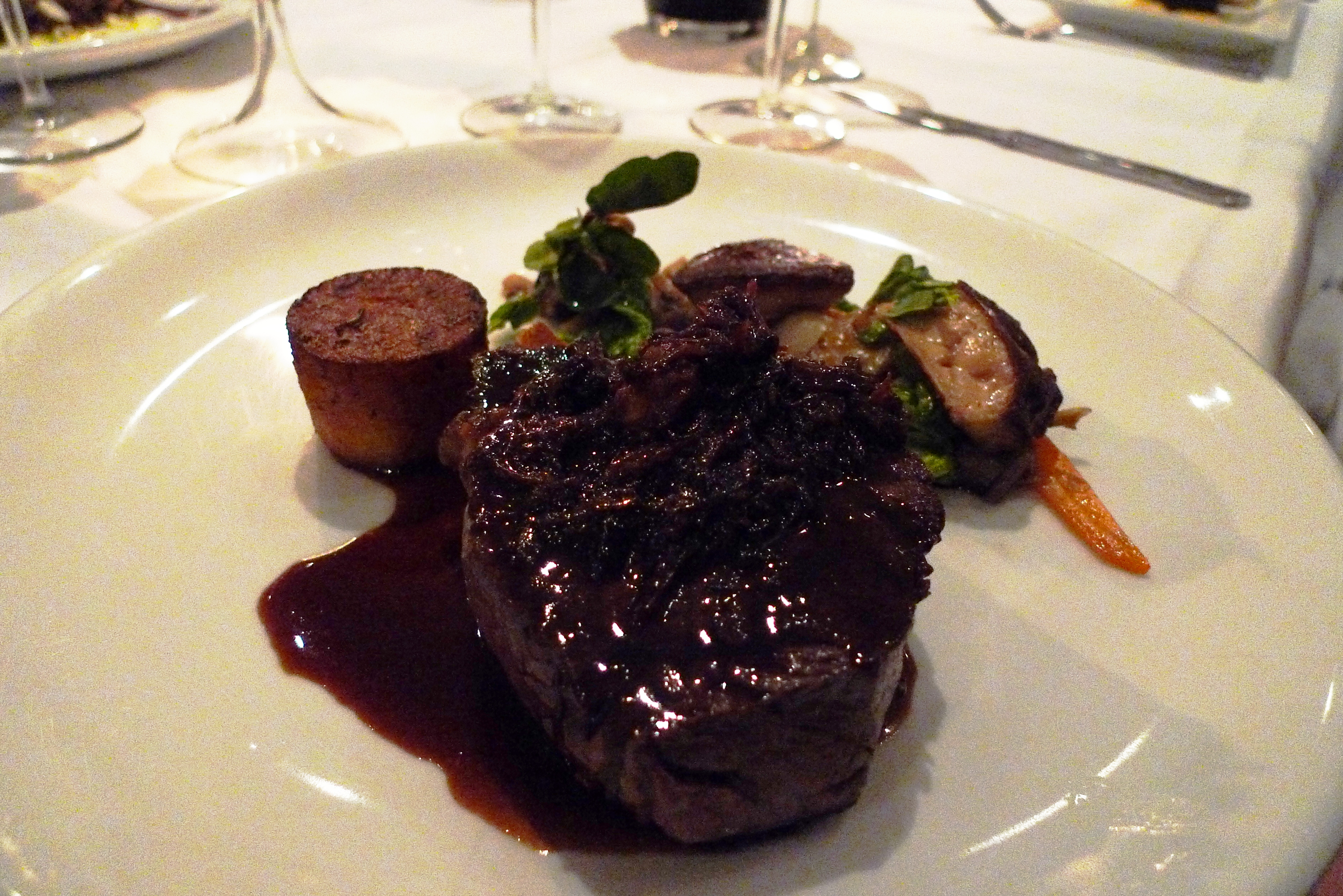
Fondant potatoes, such as the cupcake-shaped item to the left of the meat, are typically served as a side dish

== See also ==
- List of potato dishes
