= Bombay potato =

Indian potato dish

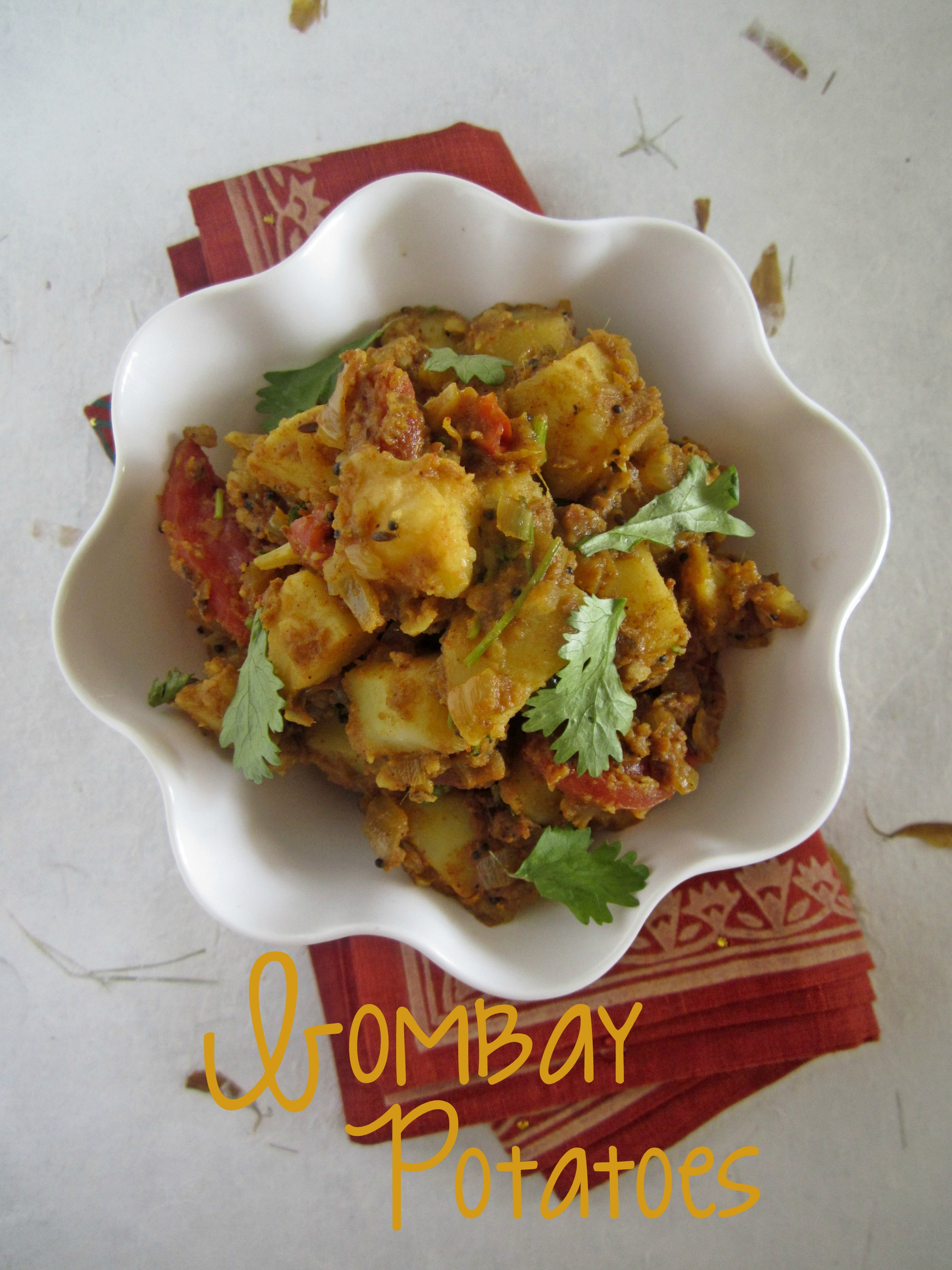
- Alternative names: Bombay aloo, Aloo or Alu Bombay
- Course: Main or side dish
- Place of origin: India
- Main ingredients: Potato, cumin, curry, garlic, garam masala, turmeric, mustard seeds, chili powder, salt and pepper

Bombay potato (sometimes called Bombay potatoes, Bombay aloo or aloo (alu) Bombay) is an Indian dish prepared using potatoes that are cubed, parboiled and then fried and seasoned with various spices such as cumin, curry, garlic, garam masala, turmeric, mustard seeds, chili powder, salt and pepper. Onion, tomatoes and tomato sauce are sometimes used as ingredients. Bombay potato can also be served as a side dish, rather than as a main course.

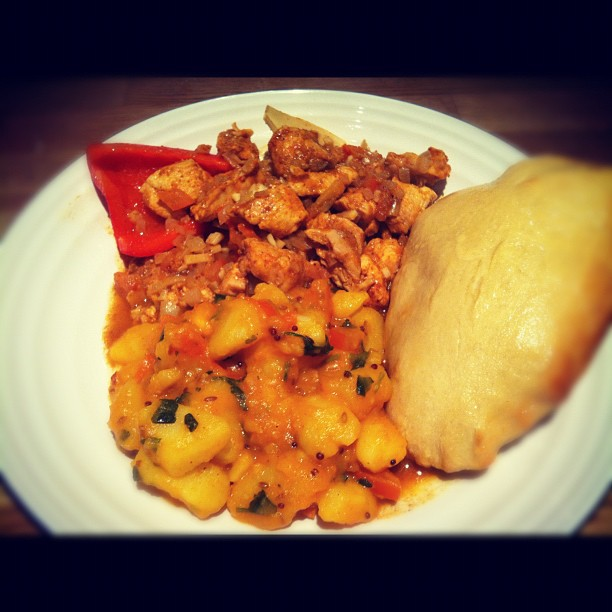
Chicken Jalfrezi, with side of Bombay potato and naan

== See also ==
- Jeera aloo
- Aloo gobi
- List of potato dishes
