= Kouign patatez =

Breton potato dish

- Type: Galette
- Place of origin: France
- Region or state: Brittany
- Main ingredients: Potatoes, buckwheat flour

Kouign patatez (Breton for potato cake) is a Breton dish made with crushed baked potatoes mixed with flour, traditionally buckwheat flour (blé noir, or sarrasin). The resulting dough is shaped into a galette, then baked in the oven.
