= Salt potatoes =

Regional dish of Syracuse, New York, US

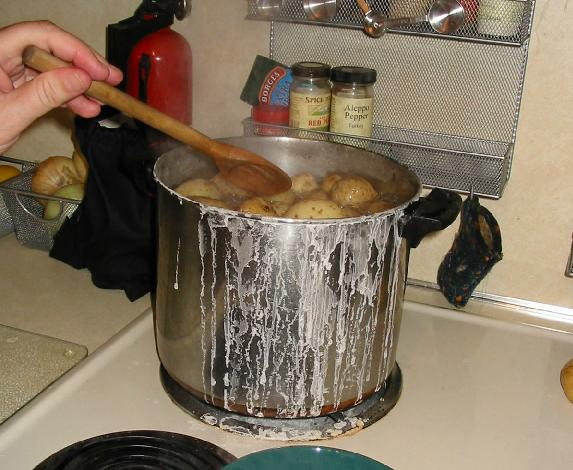
- Cooking salt potatoes
- Course: Side dish
- Place of origin: United States
- Region or state: Northeast
- Serving temperature: Hot
- Main ingredients: Bite-size "young" white potatoes; Salt; Melted butter

Salt potatoes are a regional dish of Syracuse, New York, typically served in the summer when the young potatoes are first harvested. They are a staple food at fairs and barbecues in the Central New York region, where they are most popular. Potatoes specifically intended for salt potatoes can be purchased by the bag along with packages of salt.

As the potatoes cook, the salty water forms a crust on the skin, and the higher boiling temperature allows the starch in the potato to cook more completely, giving a creamier texture.

== Background ==
The Syracuse area of New York has a long history of salt production. Brine from salt springs located around Onondaga Lake was used to create consumable salt that was distributed throughout the northeast via the Erie Canal. Salinated brine was boiled dry in large vats known as "salt blocks", and the salt residue was then scraped up, ground, and packaged.

In the 19th century, Irish salt miners would bring a bag of small, unpeeled, substandard potatoes to work each day, and boil the potatoes in the salt blocks. At one point, salt potatoes comprised most of a salt worker's daily diet.

The earliest written record of salt potatoes being served outside of the salt works is an 1883 menu from a saloon run by the Keefe brothers, who were the sons of a salt manufacturer. They quickly became popular in other taverns and bars, where they started being served with melted butter. The dish gained popularity when it was introduced in 1904 as part of the popular clambakes served at Hinerwadel's Grove in North Syracuse, and Hinerwadel's began selling salt potato kits in local stores 1981.

In 2021, a historical marker was erected outside the Onondaga County Salt Museum commemorating the dish.

=== Preparation ===
Salt potatoes are bite-size "young" white potatoes scrubbed and boiled in their skins. The size of potatoes popularized by Hinerwadels are Size B, Grade US No. 2.

According to a recipe in The New York Times, the cooking water contains salt in a ratio of one cup of salt to six cups of water, giving the dish its name, unique flavor, and texture. Other standard recipes focus the ratio on the potatoes, prescribing one pound of salt for every four pounds of potatoes.

After cooking, salt potatoes are served with melted butter.

The resulting potatoes are creamy, as the starch in the potatoes cooks more completely due to the higher boiling temperature of the extra-salty water. The salty skin stands up particularly well to both herbed and plain melted butter.

== Salt potatoes in Germany ==
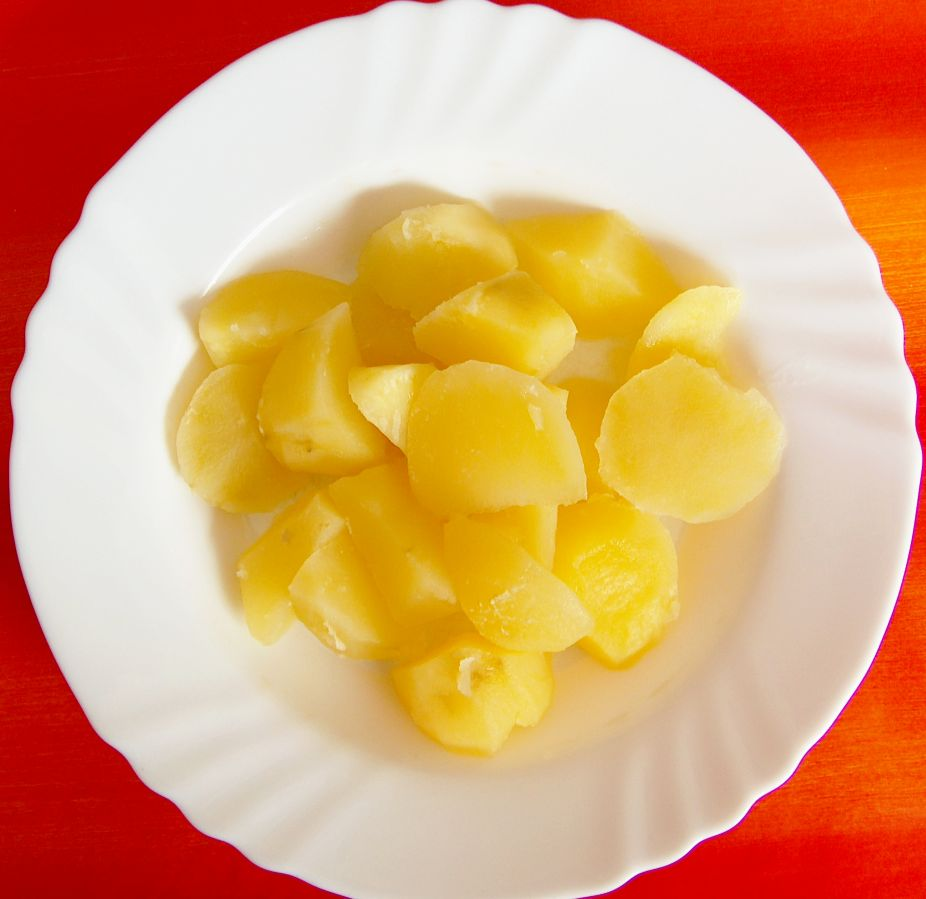
Salzkartoffeln

In Germany there is a dish with the same name, Salzkartoffeln. However, far less salt is used compared to Syracuse salt potatoes; also, the potatoes are peeled prior to cooking. So, despite the direct literal translation, 'boiled potatoes' is arguably a more practical interpretation. Salzkartoffeln is a popular side dish in many German meals. The name Salzkartoffeln is used to distinguish peeled potatoes boiled in slightly salted water from unpeeled ones, usually boiled without any salt. The latter is called Pellkartoffeln ('potatoes in peel') and is eaten with butter or quark.

== See also ==
- Papas arrugadas
- List of regional dishes of the United States
