= Farali potatoes =

Dish in Indian cuisine

- Alternative names: Suki Bhaji
- Place of origin: North-western and Western parts of India
- Region or state: Gujarat, Maharashtra, Rajasthan
- Main ingredients: potatoes, cumin seeds, groundnut powder, curry leaves, sesame seeds

Farali dry potatoes or farali potatoes is a dish in Indian cuisine. It is a dish which can be eaten during fasting ("farali" refers to fasting).

== Variations ==
Sabudana vada is a type of deep fried farali potato dish that is prepared with green chili peppers, potatoes and sabudanas.

Buff wada is a variant of the farali potato dish consisting of potato balls, stuffed with masala (mixed spices), are deep-fried.

== See also ==
- Bhajji
- Shraavana
