= Papas arrugadas =

Canarian potato dish

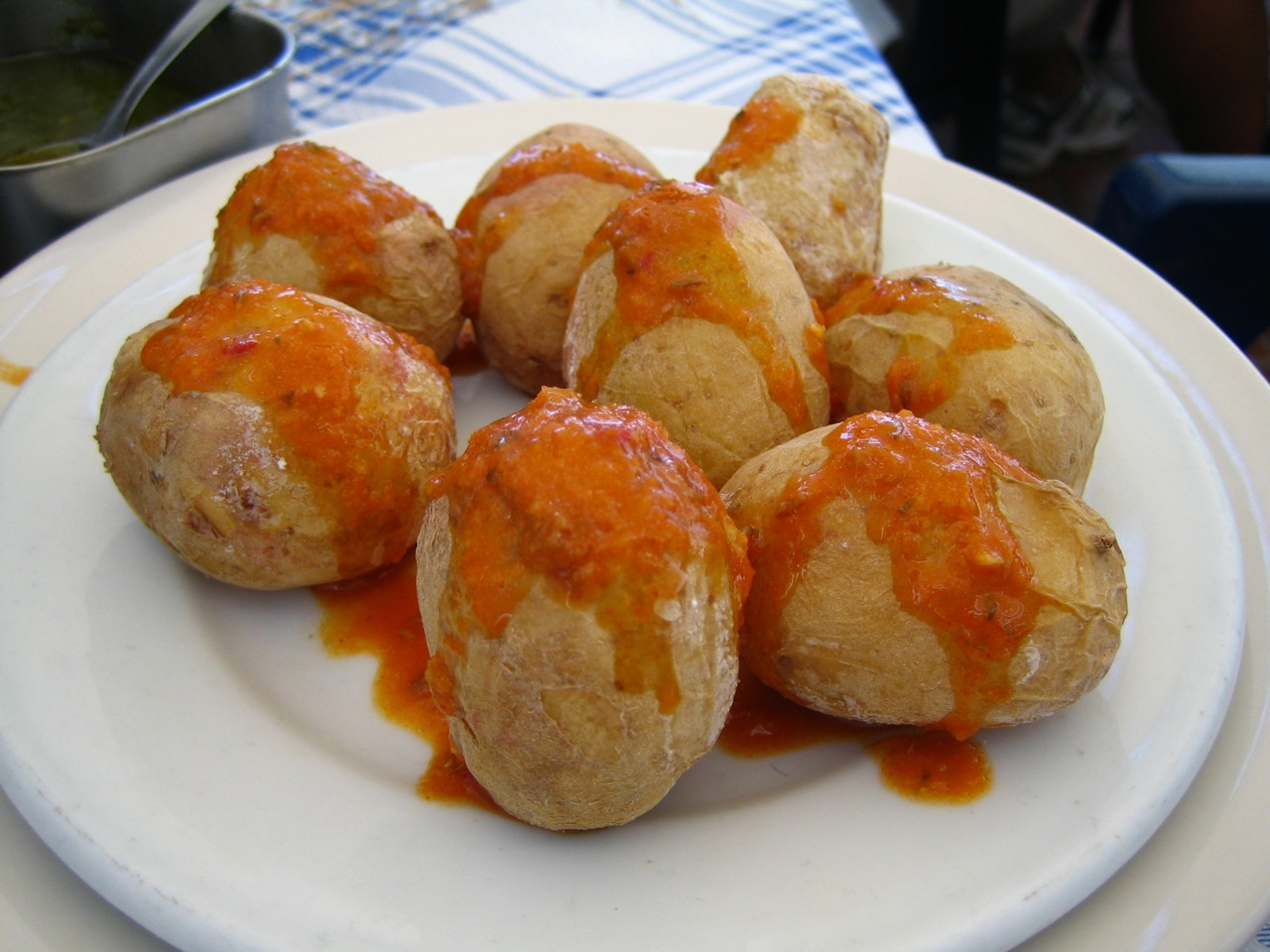
- Papas arrugadas with red mojo sauce
- Course: Appetiser or side dish
- Place of origin: Spain
- Region or state: Canary Islands
- Serving temperature: Warm
- Main ingredients: Potatoes

Papas arrugadas ([ˈpapas aruˈɣaðas] lit. 'wrinkly potatoes') is a boiled potato dish eaten in the Canary Islands, usually served with a chili pepper garlic sauce called mojo rojo. Often served as a side dish to meat or fish, they are also eaten on their own as tapas. Papas arrugadas are generally eaten without cutlery, dipped into the sauces of shared dishes at meals.

Locally, the dish is often made from potato varieties known as papas antiguas (ancient potatoes) such as the papa bonita or papa negra, which are cleaned and boiled unpeeled in salt water. The varieties, originally from the Andes, have a Protected Designation of Origin (PDO) status in the archipelago.

Originally, seawater was used, but today it is more common to use tap water with a large quantity of salt added. According to stories of the dish's origin, seawater was chosen due to the scarcity of fresh drinking water on the islands. After cooking, the water is removed and the potatoes are briefly left in the pot on the stove to dry off, until they become shrivelled with a fine salt crust. Due to the thin skin of these varieties, they are typically eaten unpeeled.

Papas arrugadas are considered a signature dish of Canarian cuisine. The dish is sometimes served with conejo en salmorejo, a common Canarian rabbit stew. Claudia Roden described the potato's texture as firm but tender, and its flavour as tasting intensely of potato but not of salt, stating it had not been absorbed in cooking.

== See also ==
- Salt potatoes
- List of Spanish dishes
