= Pommes boulangère =

Savoury dish

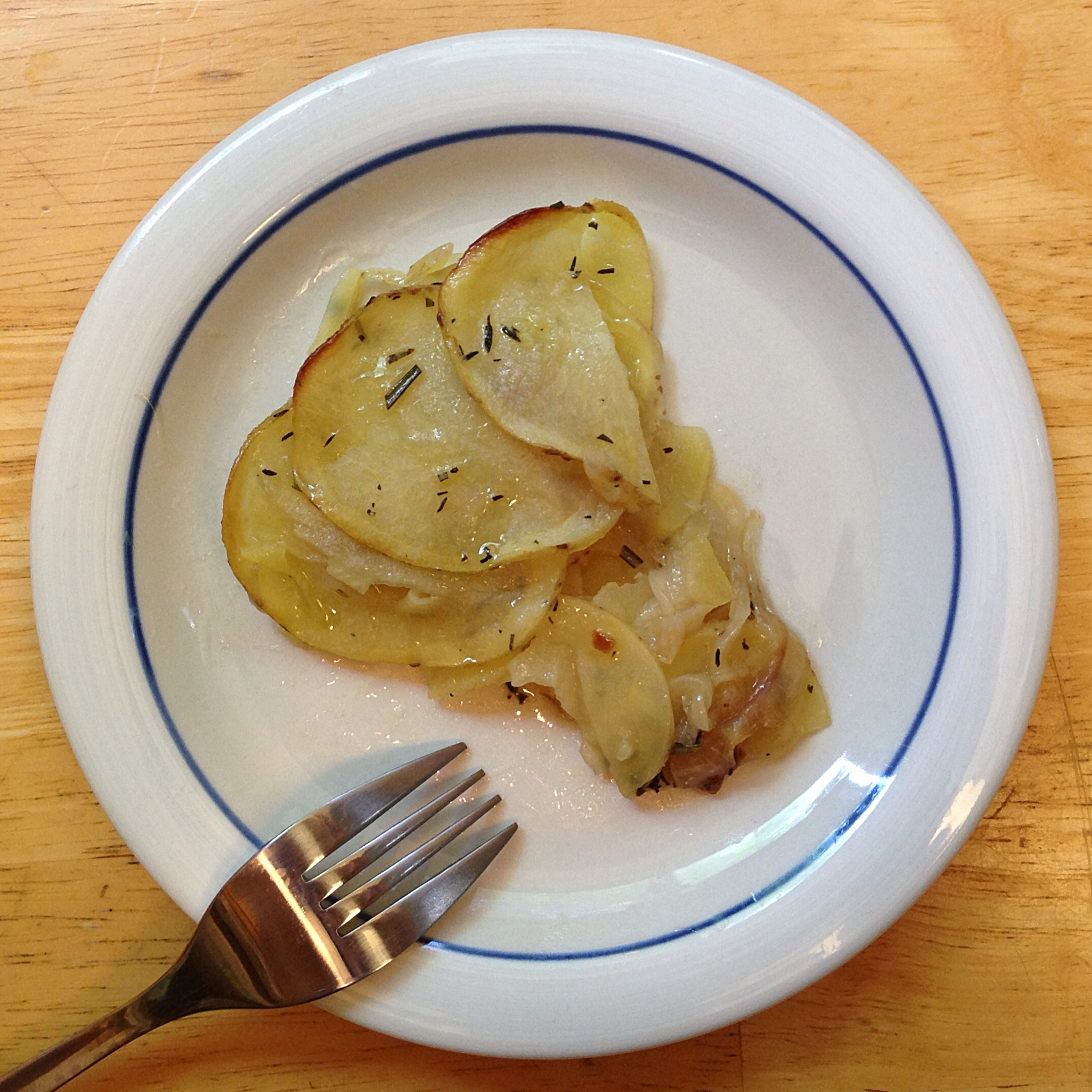
- Pommes boulangère
- Alternative names: Pommes à la boulangère
- Place of origin: France
- Main ingredients: Potatoes, onion and cooking liquid

Pommes boulangère or pommes à la boulangère – "baker's potatoes" (Note: According to the Dictionnaire de l'Académie française the term derives from the old Picard word "boulenc" – "baker, maker of bread in ball".) – is a savoury dish of sliced potato and onion, cooked slowly in liquid in an oven.

== Background ==
The name of the dish is said to derive from an old practice in French villages, where householders without their own ovens would take the prepared dish to the village bakery. After the baker had finished making his bread, the potato dish would cook slowly while the oven gradually died down.

== Ingredients and variations ==
The basic ingredients are potatoes, onions and cooking liquid. The dish, cooked slowly in a low oven, gradually absorbing the cooking liquid, has a crisp top layer of sliced potatoes, with a softer mixture of onion and potato beneath. It is usual to season it with some or all of garlic, herbs (particularly rosemary or sage), salt and pepper, and to top the dish with dabs of butter before cooking, but there are several published variations:

Cook/writer	Cooking liquid	Additions	Ref
James Beard	unspecified bouillon		
Heston Blumenthal	lamb stock and white wine		
Paul Bocuse	water	tomatoes	
Daniel Boulud	chicken stock		
Angela Hartnett	chicken stock		
Jean-Christophe Novelli	chicken or vegetable stock	blanched cabbage in the layers, Red Leicester cheese to top	
Jamie Oliver	vegetable stock	Parmesan cheese to top	
Jacques Pépin	chicken stock		
Gordon Ramsay	chicken stock		
Michel Roux, Jr.	chicken stock		
Guy Savoy	chicken stock and white wine		
Delia Smith	vegetable stock		
Patricia Wells	white wine and chicken stock	leeks	

Despite the French name, the dish is not unique to France. The Yorkshire-born chef Brian Turner recalled in his memoirs (2000) being given an identical potato dish in his childhood, and Bobby Freeman in a 1997 book about Welsh cuisine gives a recipe for traditional Teisen nionod (onion cake), which she describes as "the same dish as the French pommes boulangère".

When diced bacon is added to the potatoes and onions, and the dish is topped with grated cheese before baking, it is known as pommes savoyarde (or alternatively as pommes Chambéry).

== Notes, references and sources ==
=== Sources ===
- Beard, James (1974). The Best of Beard. New York: Golden Press. ISBN 0307487172.
- Blumenthal, Heston (2011). Heston Blumenthal at Home. London: Bloomsbury. OCLC 1335927951.
- Bocuse, Paul (1982). Bocuse dans votre cuisine. Paris: Flammarion. ISBN 2082000869.
- Boulud, Daniel (1999). Café Boulud Cookbook. New York: Scribner. OCLC 1193384062.
- Freeman, Bobby (1997). Traditional Food from Wales. New York: Hippocrene. OCLC 1285848394.
- Novelli, Jean-Christophe (2007). Everyday Novelli. London: Headline. ISBN 978-0755317172.
- Pépin, Jacques (2000). Jacques Pépin's Simple and Healthy Cooking. London: Hi Marketing. ISBN 0875963625.
- Ramsay, Gordon (2006). Gordon Ramsay's Sunday Lunch. London: Quadrille. ISBN 1844002802.
- Roux, Michel Jr (2013). The French Kitchen: Recipes from the Master of French Cooking. San Francisco: Weldon Owen. OCLC 1319320336.
- Saulnier, Louis (1978) [1923]. Le répertoire de la cuisine (fourteenth ed.). London: Jaeggi. OCLC 1086737491.
- Savoy, Guy (1987). Vegetable Magic. London: Ebury. OCLC 1280845785.
- Turner, Brian (2000). A Yorkshire Lad: My Life with Recipes. London: Headline. ISBN 0747273669.
- Wells, Patricia (1990). Les 200 meuilleures recettes de bistrot. Paris: Lattès. ISBN 2253063045.
