= Acadian cuisine =

Cuisine of the Acadian people

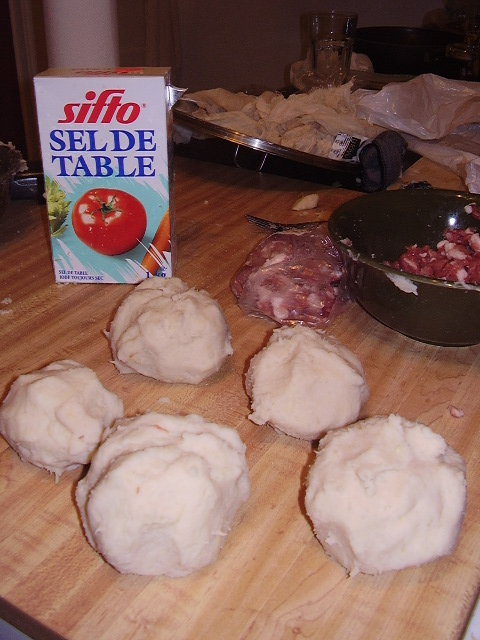
Poutines rapées being made.

Acadian cuisine (French: Cuisine acadienne) comprises the traditional dishes of the Acadian people. It is primarily seen in the present-day cultural region of Acadia.^{Note 1} Acadian cuisine has been influenced by the Deportation of the Acadians, proximity to the ocean, the Canadian winter, bad soil fertility, the cuisine of Quebec, American cuisine, and English cuisine, among other factors.

Acadian cuisine is not very well known in Canada or internationally. It has much in common with Québécois cuisine because of its geographical proximity. The two often feature the same dishes, but the cuisine of Acadia puts more emphasis on seafood. Acadian cuisine has notably served as the base for Cajun cuisine because the Cajun are descendants of Acadians who were deported to Louisiana.^{Note 2} It is also believed that Acadians are responsible for normalizing potato consumption in France—a vegetable the French once considered poisonous.

== History ==
In the 17th century, French colonists who settled on lands they named Acadia adapted their 16th-century French cuisine to incorporate the crops, seafood and animals that flourished in the region. Their descendants became the Acadian people and their ingenuity created Acadian cuisine.

After the English conquered Acadia during the 18th century, they decided to deport the Acadians and take their settlements, which were often built on the most fertile earth in the colony. Most Acadians did not manage to escape the deportation. But, of those who did, most fled to the east and north of New Brunswick^{Note 3}. As such, Acadian cuisine in the 18th century was refocused around what could be grown, hunted and fished in the less fertile lands of the East Coast of New Brunswick and the Upper St. John River Valley.

== Ingredients ==
Acadian cuisine often features fish and seafood, especially cod and Atlantic herring, but also mackerel, berlicoco, lobster, crab, salmon, mussels, trout, clams, flounder, smelt and scallops. Most fish is consumed fresh, but some are boucané (smoked), marinated or salted.

The most commonly used meat is pork, followed by chicken and beef. As with the rest of North America, turkey is commonly consumed during the holidays. Game like deer, hare, ruffed grouse and moose is consumed regularly in some regions. Game will replace livestock meat if present and can be given as a gift. In some regions, for example Caraquet and the Îles-de-la-Madeleine, more unusual game is or was caught, like seal, bear and seagull.

The vegetables of Acadian cuisine are the potato, onion, carrot, turnip, legume, beet, squash and corn. These vegetables were popular because they were easily preserved for the winter in root cellars and jars. The fiddlehead fern was introduced to the Acadians by the indigenous Maliseet, Mi'kmaq and Penobscot peoples in the early 18th Century and remains a popular Acadian dish.

Popular fruits include blueberries, apples, strawberries, raspberries, blackberries, plums, pears and cranberries.

Some ingredients like rice, molasses, dried raisins and brown sugar are part of Acadian cuisine because of historical commerce between Acadia and regions like the Antilles and Brazil. Maple sugar is also a popular sweetener, given the often-close familial ties between Quebec (the world's largest producer of maple sugar) and Acadia.

== Dishes ==
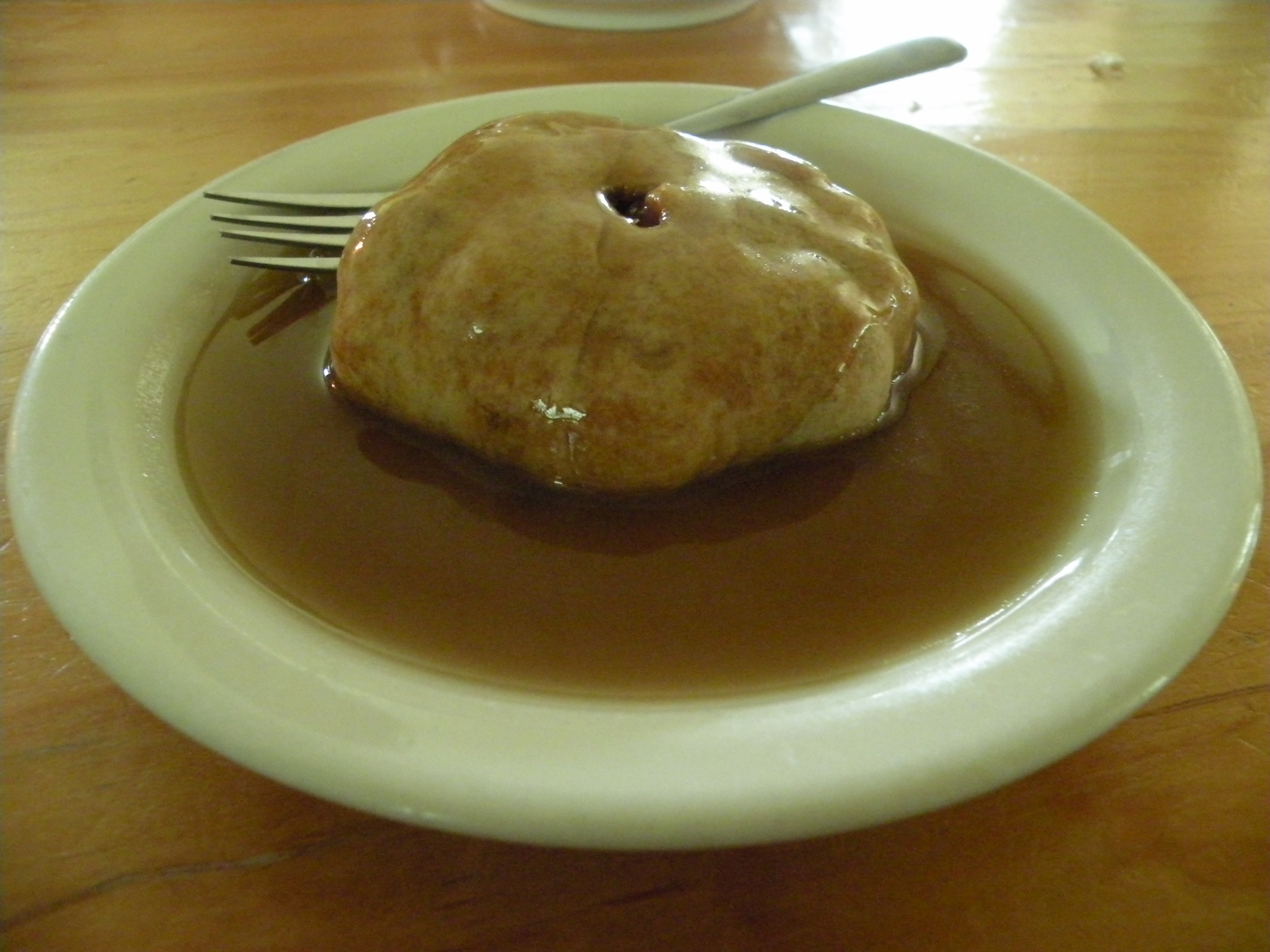
A poutine à trou smothered in maple syrup.

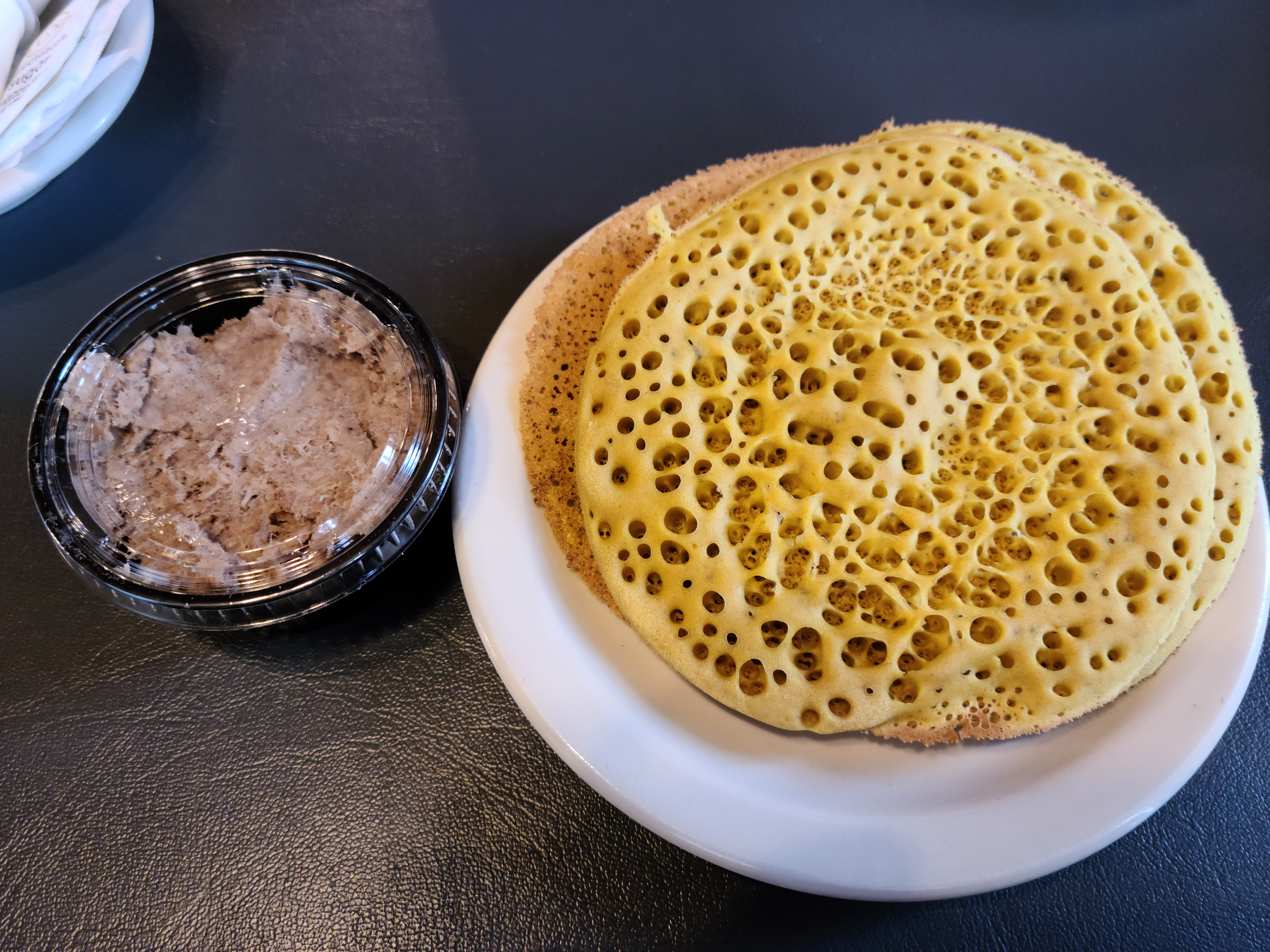
Ployes are popular in the Madawaska region.

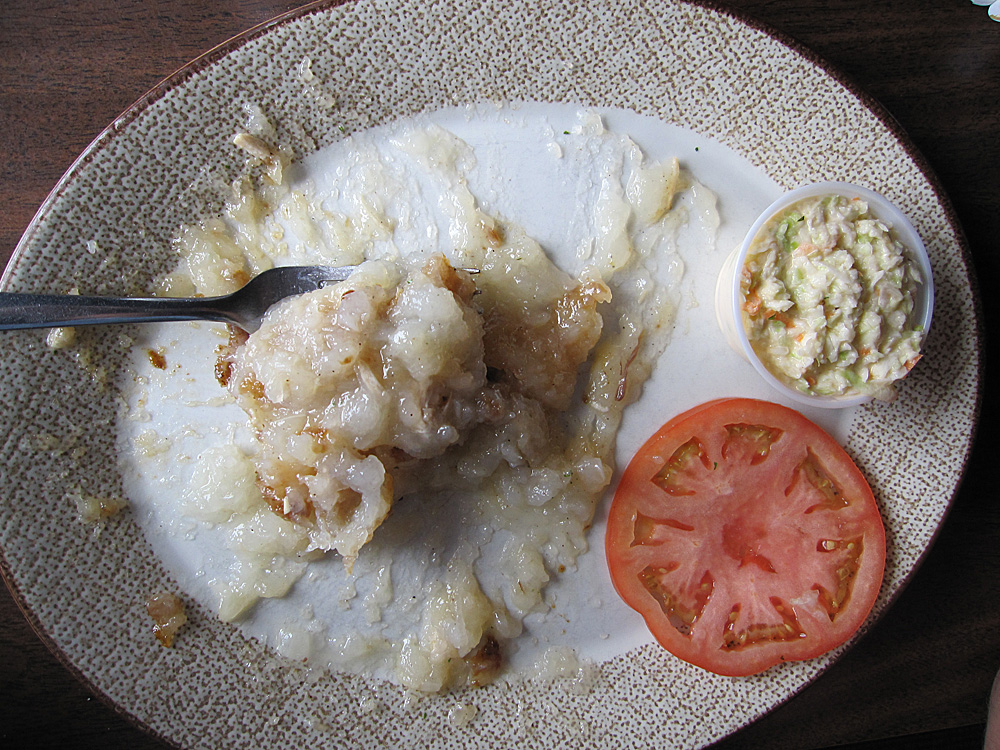
Rappie pie or râpure is a dish whose name comes from patates râpées, meaning "grated potatoes".

Some examples of traditional Acadian dishes are:

- Beurre de homard—lobster butter
- Bouilli acadien—a boiled dinner consisting of potatoes, salted beef or pork, carrots, green beans, cabbage and turnips.
- Bouillie à la viande salée
- Bouillon aux coques
- Chiard/mioche—purée of potatoes, carrots or turnips.
- Chow-chow—a North American pickled relish.
- Cipâte—sea-pie
- Coques frites—fried clams
- Coquille Saint-Jacques—a sea scallop dish.
- Cretons—a type of boiled, ground pork pâté.
- Croquettes de poisson—fishcake.
- Doigt-à-l'ail—garlic finger
- Fricot—a type of stew, consisting of potatoes, onions, and whatever meat was available, topped with dumplings.
- Morue bouillie avec patates et beurre fondu—cod and pan-fried potatoes in butter.
- Pain au homard—a lobster and mayonnaise sandwich.
- Pâté au poisson—fish paste.
- Pâté chinois—mashed potatoes, ground beef and creamed corn.
- Pets de sœurs—pastry filled with butter and brown sugar, rolled, sliced and baked.
- Ploye—pancake-like mix of buckwheat flour, wheat flour.
- Pouding chômeur—poor man's pudding.
- Poutine râpée—boiled potato dumpling with a pork filling.
- Poutine à trou—baked apple dumplings.
- Poutine au bleuet—French fries with cheese, gravy, and blueberries.
- Ragoût—a thick soup.
- Rappie pie/râpure—grated potatoes and chicken or salted pork.
- Soupe aux pois—Canadian pea soup.
- Tarte au sucre acadienne—Acadian sugar pie.
- Tchaude—fish chowder.
- Tourtière: meat pie.

== See also ==
- Cuisine of Quebec
- Cajun cuisine
- Occitan cuisine
- Gumbo

== Notes ==
1. "Acadia," when referring to Acadia before the Deportation of the Acadians, is the Acadia colony owned by France, which is today the Maritime region of Canada. "Acadia," when referring to Acadia after the Deportation of the Acadians, is the regions in which Acadians live today. The Acadia of today is the north and east of New Brunswick, and some small parts of Prince Edward Island and Nova Scotia.

2. Louisiana is not the only place outside of Canada where many people of Acadian descent can be found; there is also France, the Falkland Islands, the Antilles, New England and Texas.

3. A few Acadians also fled to sections of Cape Breton, western Nova Scotia and south Prince Edward Island. Because of their relative distance from New Brunswick, these communities experienced their own challenges and developed some unique dishes. Some also escaped to New France (now Québec) and assimilated to the Canadien population.

== Bibliography ==
- Marielle Cormier Boudreau and Melvin Gallant, La Cuisine traditionnelle en Acadie : historique des traditions et coutumes culinaires chez les Acadiens du Nouveau-Brunswick, de la Nouvelle-Écosse, de l'Île-du-Prince-Édouard et des Îles-de-la-Madeleine, Moncton, Éditions d'Acadie (réimpr. 1980, 1987) (1re éd. 1975), 181 p.
- Ghislain Savoie, Histoire de la pomme de terre et autres tubercules connus dans l'ancienne Acadie, Les Cahiers, Société historique acadienne, vol. 42, no 1, March 2011, p. 4-25
