= Tourtière du Lac-Saint-Jean =

Meat pie dish in Québécois cuisine

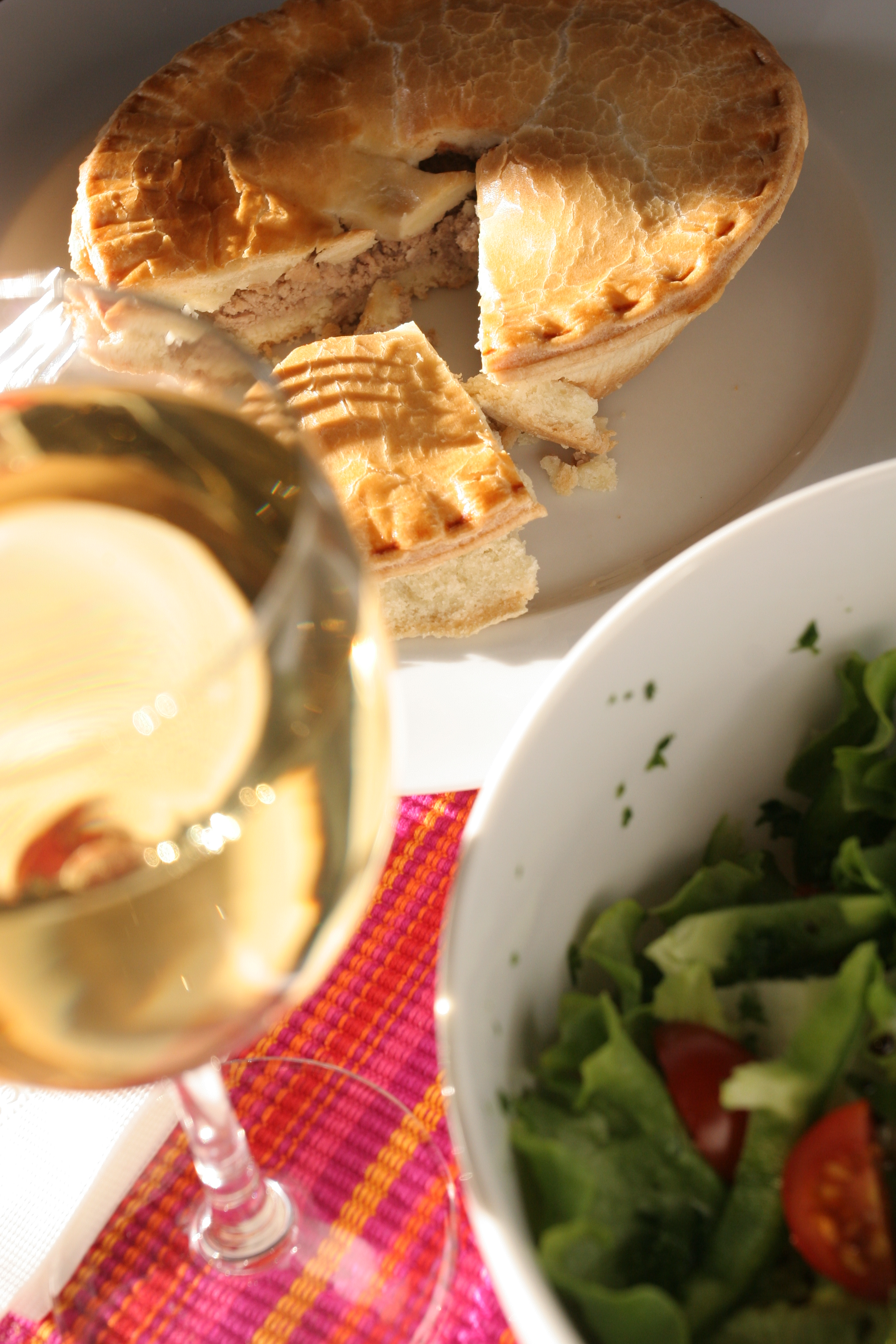

Tourtière du Lac-Saint-Jean is a Québécois dish of the pie family and a variation of the tourtière dish popular in French Canada. This variant originates from the Saguenay-Lac-Saint-Jean region of Quebec. The tourtière du Lac-Saint-Jean differs from a regular tourtière by having thicker crust, cubes of potatoes, meats and broth (instead of only minced meat), as well as being placed in a much larger and deeper container. Like a regular tourtière, the meat chosen is usually pork, beef or veal. Wild game like moose, hare and ruffed grouse is used if available. Chicken soaked in onions is also sometimes used. Tourtière du Lac-Saint-Jean is prepared for at least 10 servings, which is why it is a popular choice for festivals and "le temps des fêtes" (a time period in Quebec when families celebrate multiple Holidays in December and January). This tourtière also differs from the cipaille of Gaspésie and Acadia because it doesn't use multiple layers of dough and sometimes uses a different set of ingredients. Though, the tourtière du Lac-Saint-Jean is thought to be more closely related to the cipaille than to the regular tourtière. In fact, Saguenay-Lac-Saint-Jean residents typically reserve the name "tourtière" for this specific dish, while referring to regular tourtière as "pâté à la viande" ("meat pie").

== Etymology ==
Contrary to popular belief, the name “tourtière” does not come from the tourte voyageuse - the now extinct species of bird that used to be the most popular meat for tourtière. Rather, its name comes from a kind of container in which precursors to the tourtières of today were cooked. The oldest known recipe for a tourtière-like dish is found in the 13th-century work Liber de Coquina, in which “Torta parmigiana” is depicted with at least six layers of different ingredients.

== Gallery ==
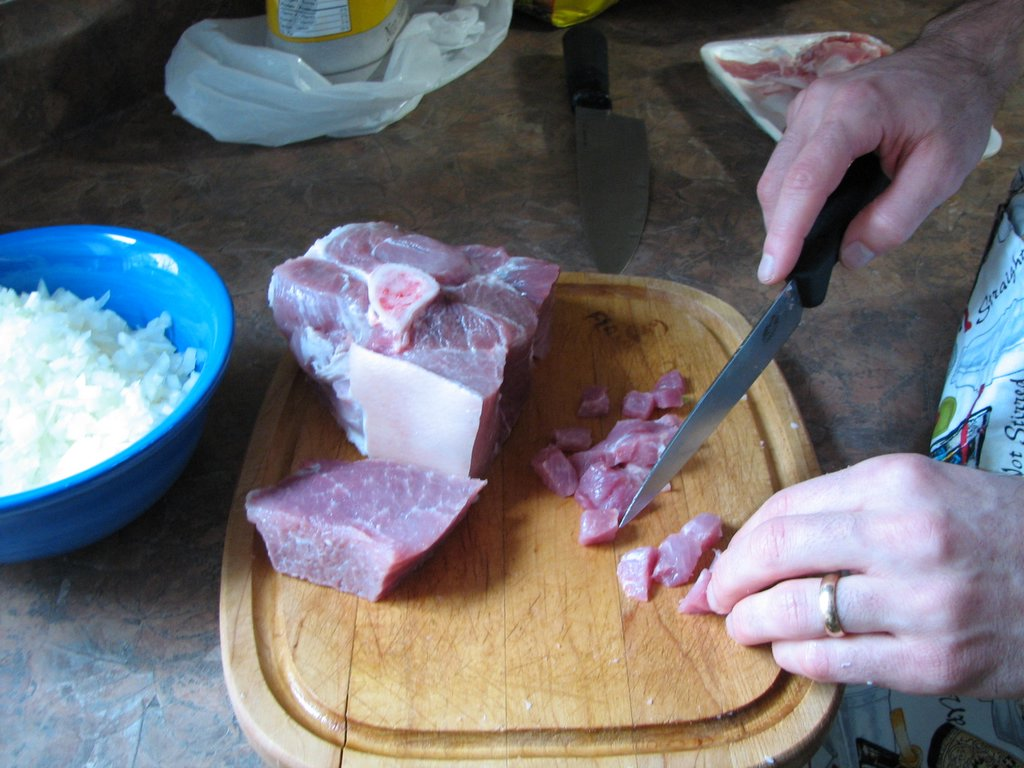
Preparation of the meat.

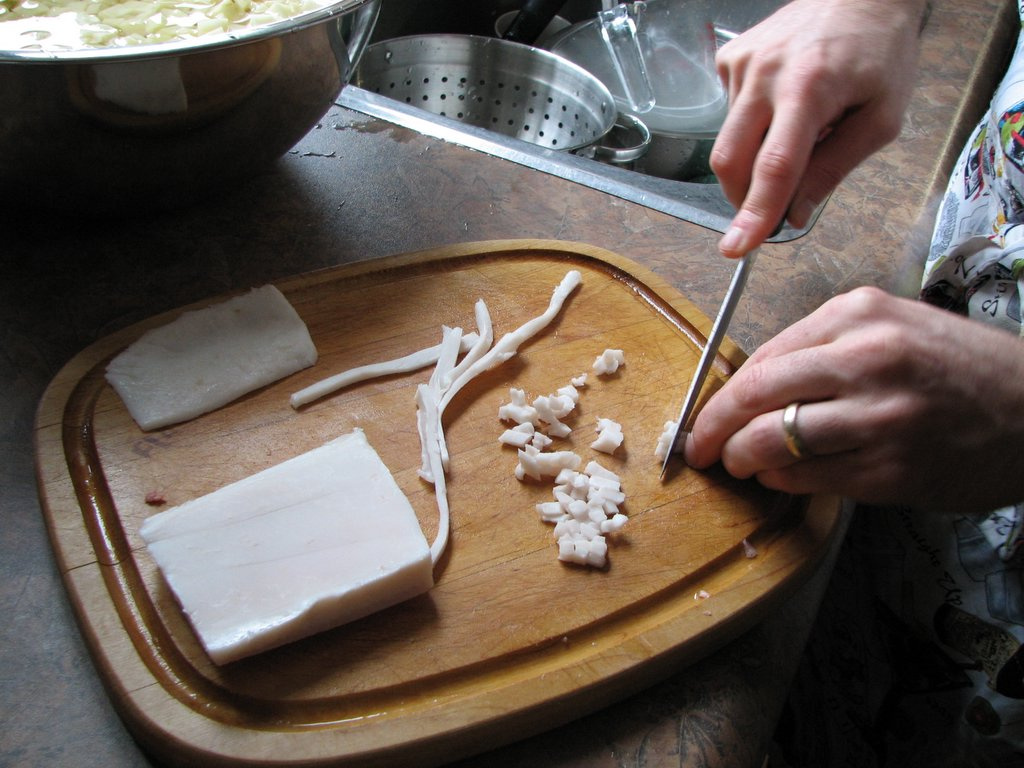
Preparation of the animal fat.

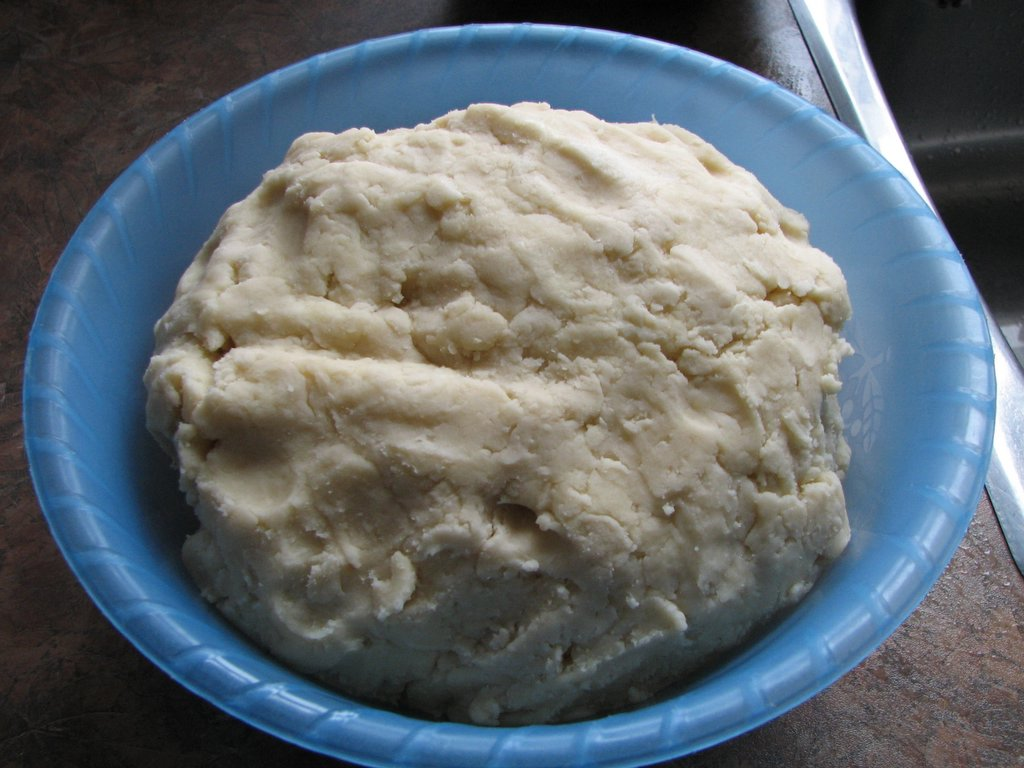
Preparation of the crust.

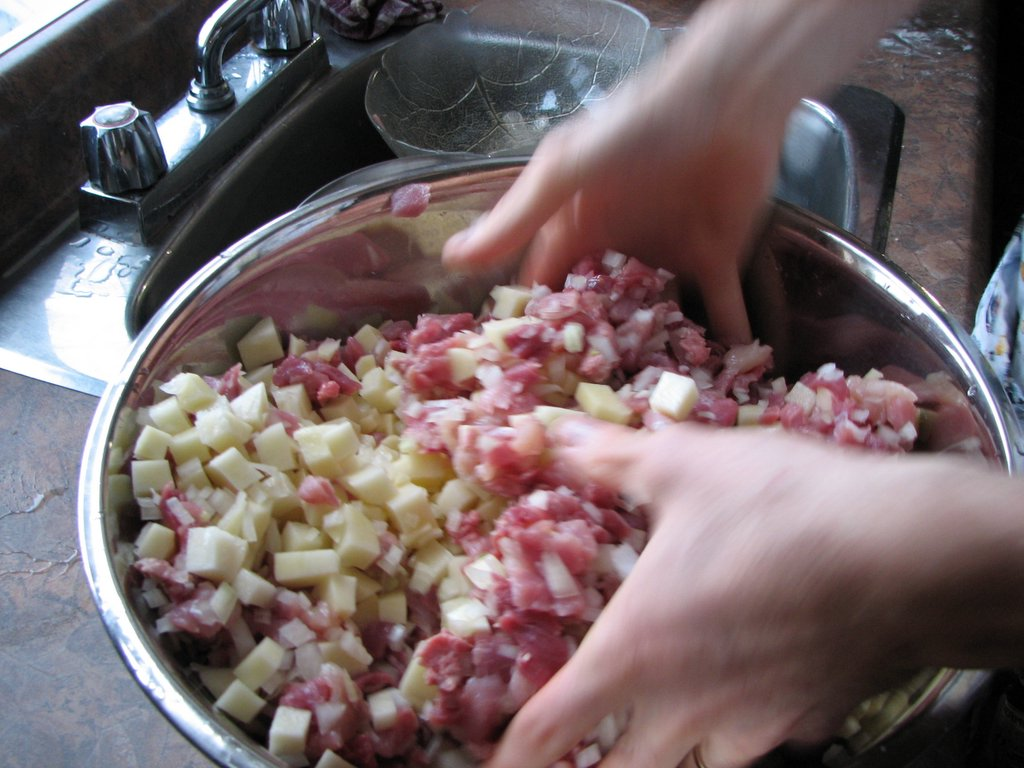
Preparation of the filling.

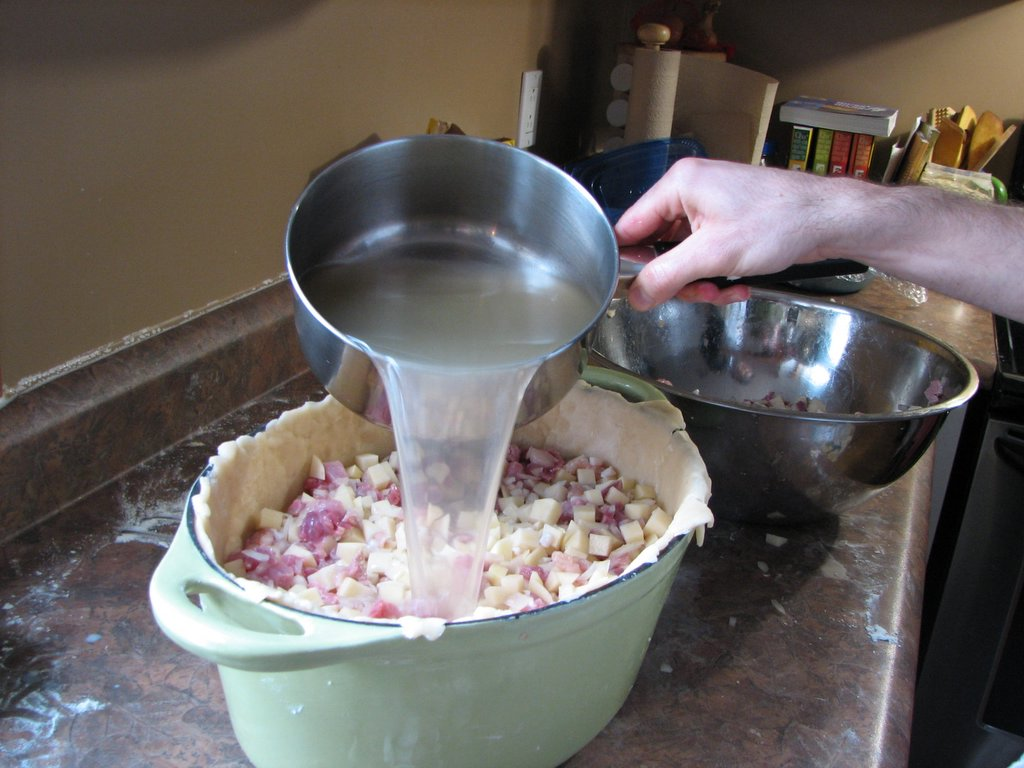
The broth is poured.

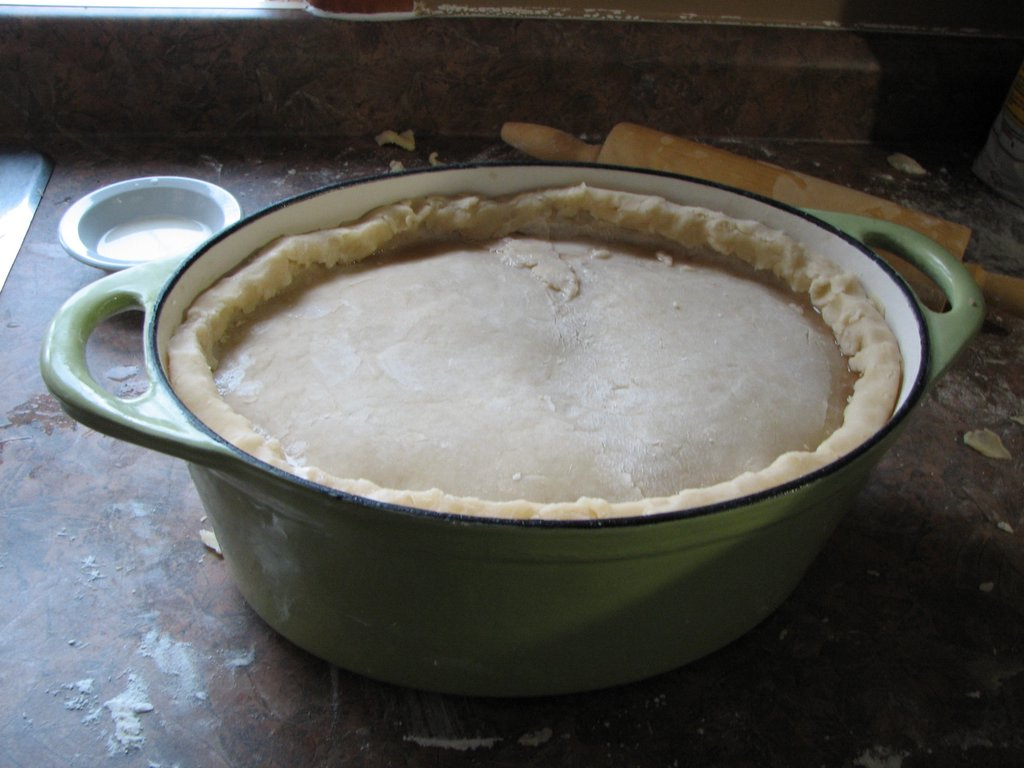
The tourtière is ready to be cooked.

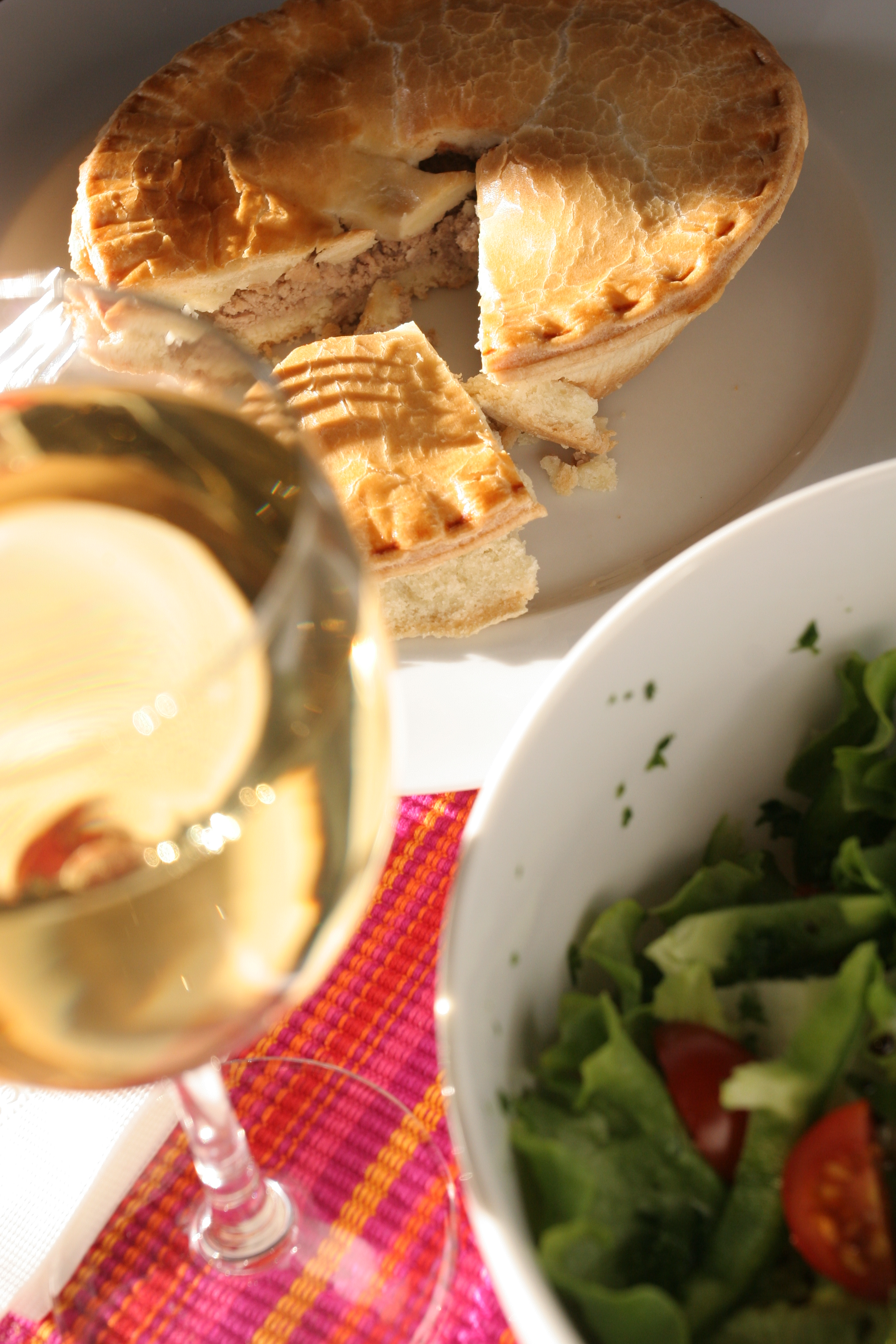
The tourtière is ready to be eaten.

== See also ==
- Tourtière
- Cuisine of Quebec
- Cipaille
- Saguenay-Lac-Saint-Jean
