= Tom's BaoBao =

Restaurant chain in the United States

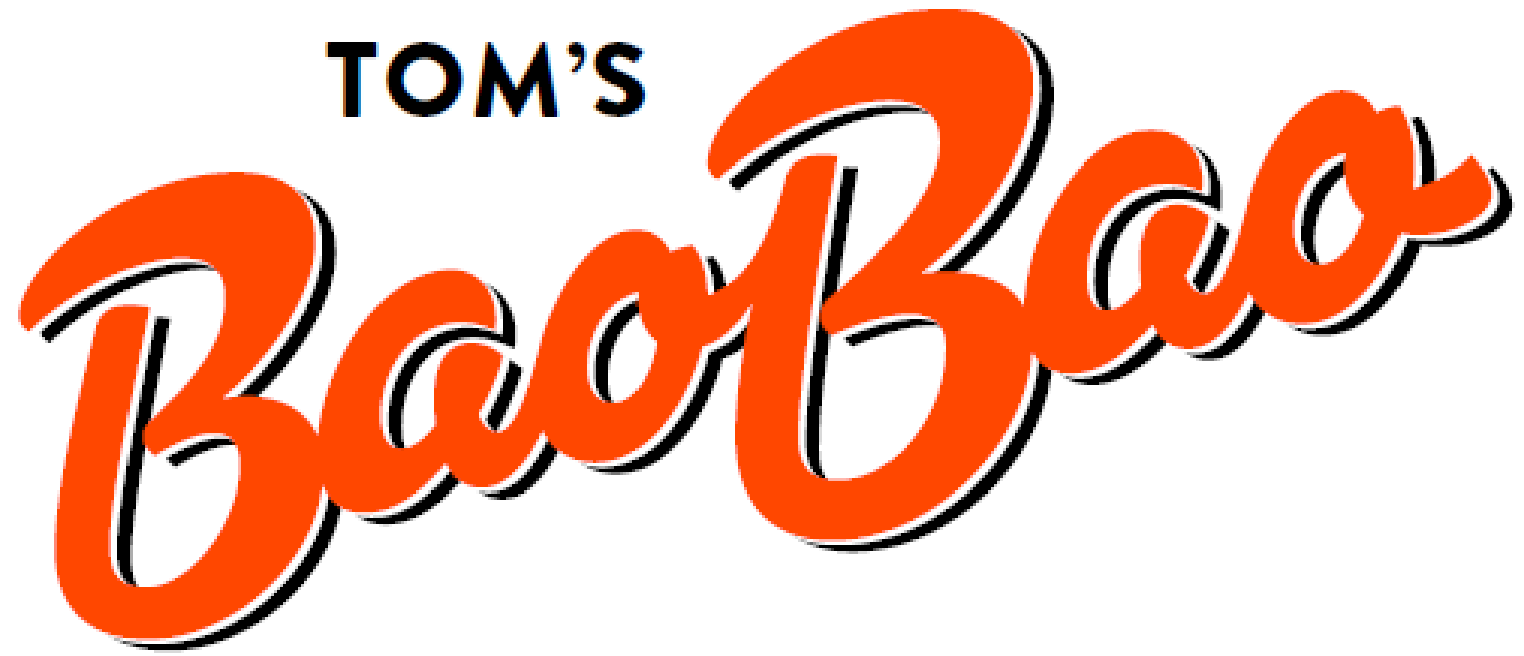
- Company type: Subsidiary
- Industry: Restaurants
- Founded: 2016 in Boston, Massachusetts
- Founder: Tom Tong
- Defunct: 2020; 6 years ago
- Headquarters: Boston, Massachusetts, US
- Number of locations: 2
- Area served: Massachusetts, Rhode Island
- Parent: GanQiShi
- Website: www.tomsbaobao.com

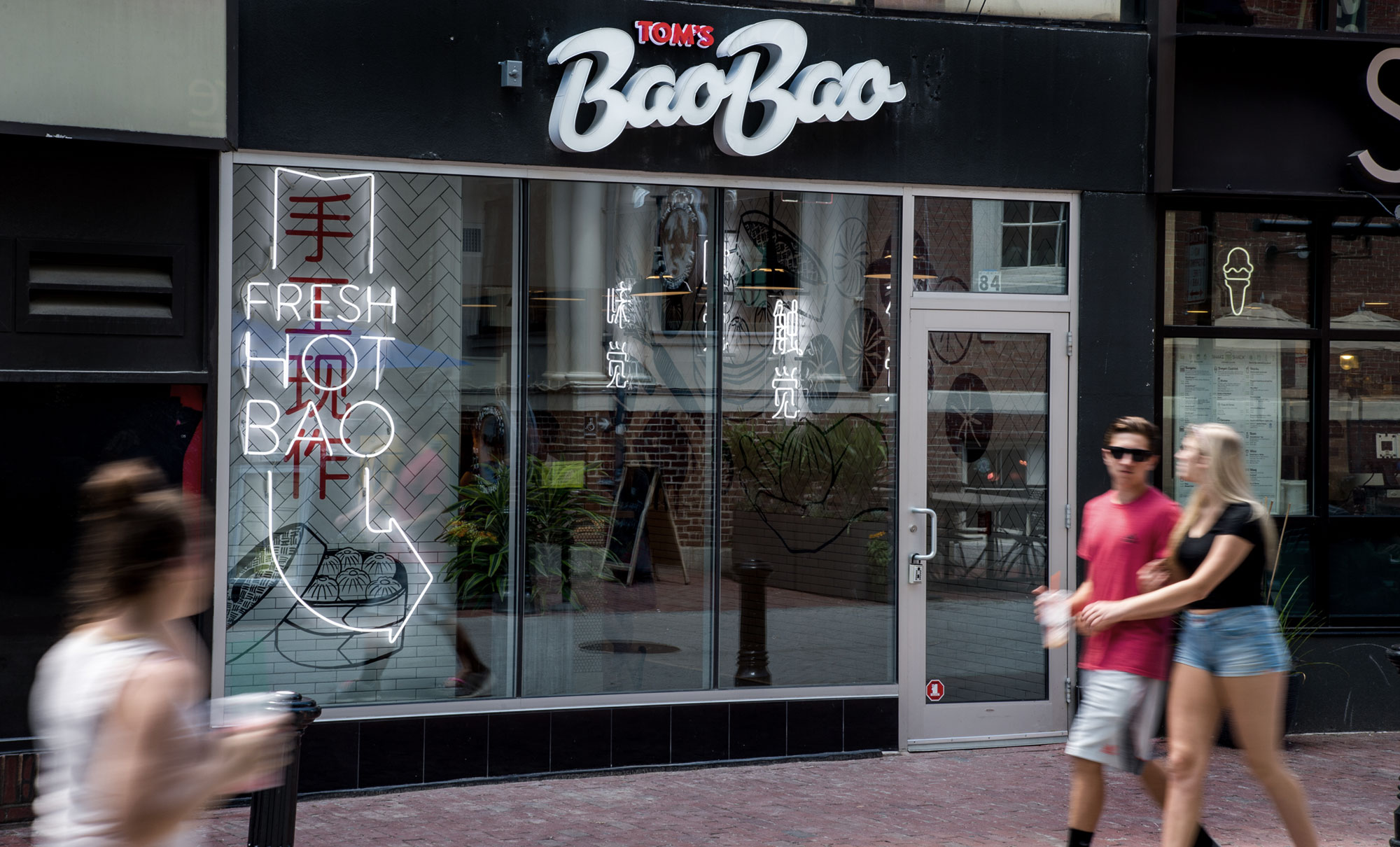
Tom's BaoBao, Harvard Square, Boston, MA – 2016

Tom's BaoBao was a fast casual restaurant specializing in traditional hand-made bao. It was a subsidiary of Ganqishi, and opened its first location in Harvard Square, Cambridge, Massachusetts.

== History ==
Tom's BaoBao Harvard Square is the first international location of the Chinese fast-casual bao restaurant, Ganqishi and was founded in 2009. Boston was partly chosen as the site of the first location because it is a sister city to Hangzhou, the hometown of Ganqishi founder Tom Tong. A second location opened in Providence, Rhode Island on October 15, 2016. It closed its Providence location three years later, in August 2019. Its Harvard Square location closed in January 2020.

== Menu ==
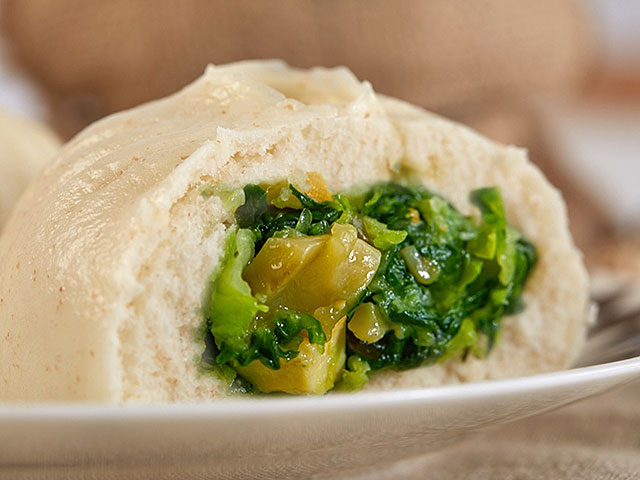
Bao

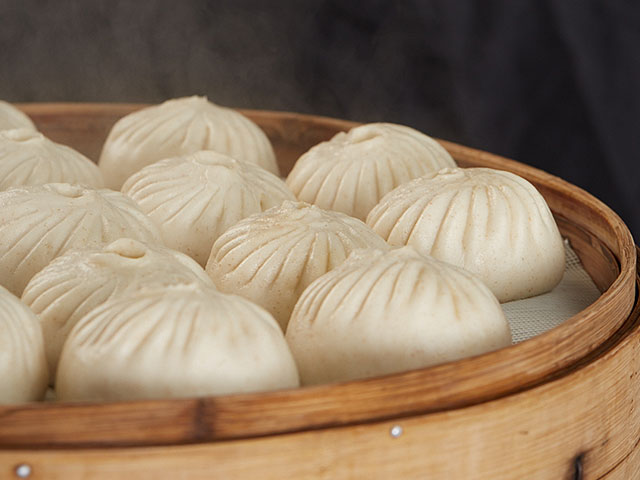
Bao in steamer

The restaurant was known for serving baozi with a variety of fillings, including meat, vegetables, seafood, cheese and other ingredients. It offered a variety of specialty types, including dessert bao, vegan bao, and holiday-themed flavors like turkey pot pie.

It also served drinks such as Oolong tea, coffee, soy milk and juices.

== See also ==
- List of Chinese restaurants
