= Lihapiirakka =

Deep-fried Finnish meat pie

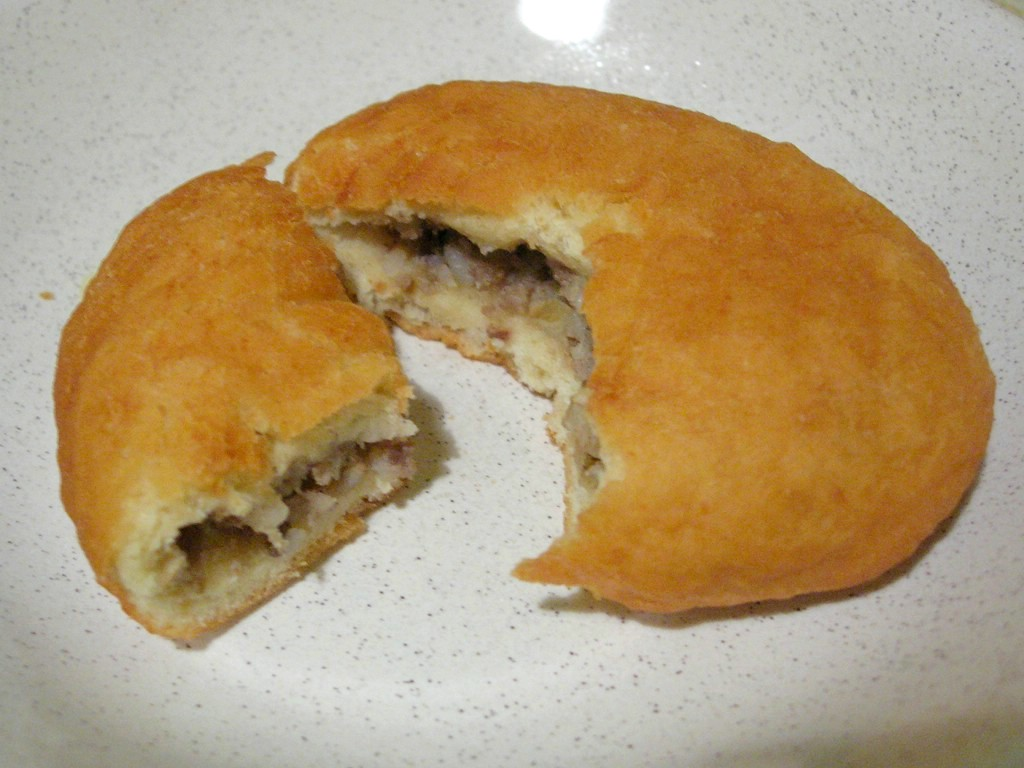
- Lihapiirakka ("meat pie") filled with mincemeat and rice
- Alternative names: Finnish meat pie
- Course: Street Food
- Place of origin: Finland
- Main ingredients: Meat, rice, yeasted bread dough
- Variations: Möttönen, atomi, vety
- Other information: Street Food

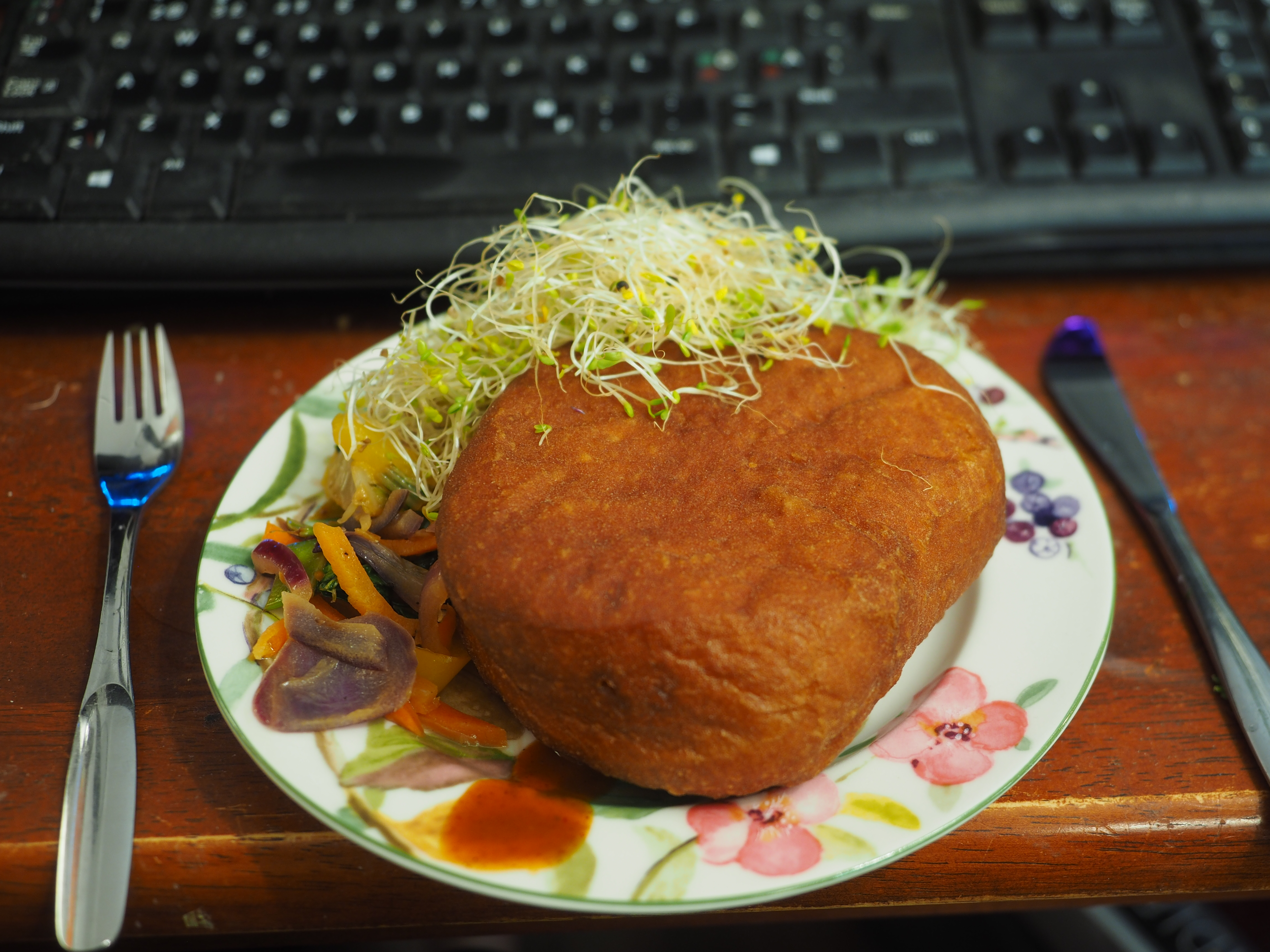
A Finnish "lihapiirakka" savoury pastry filled with ground beef, along with mixed vegetables

A lihapiirakka (Finnish pronunciation: [ˈlihɑˌpiːrɑkːɑ], literally "meat pie") is an everyday Finnish food sold in supermarkets and often available ready-to-eat as street food. It is a form of savoury pie made from yeasted enriched bread dough and filled with a mixture of minced meat and cooked rice and cooked by deep frying. It does not resemble a traditional English or American meat pie or turnover because it is made of enriched bread dough and is deep fried. They are usually bought ready-cooked and are simply reheated in a microwave oven.

A larger and thicker form is also known as a möttönen. Two variants from Lappeenranta are atomi and vety ("atom" and "hydrogen"), where atomi contains either ham or egg, and vety includes both.

Traditionally the pie is eaten whole. A contemporary way to have them is to split it in half and fill it with a frankfurter or some other type of sausage, or with kebab meat or some form of meat burger. They are generally served with ketchup, mustard and a relish similar to Bostongurka.

The term lihapiirakka may also be used for a large rectangular turnover.

== See also ==
- List of doughnut varieties
- List of fried dough varieties
- Lörtsy
- Kalakukko
- Four'n Twenty
- Steak pie
- Burek
