= Tourtière =

French-Canadian meat pie dish

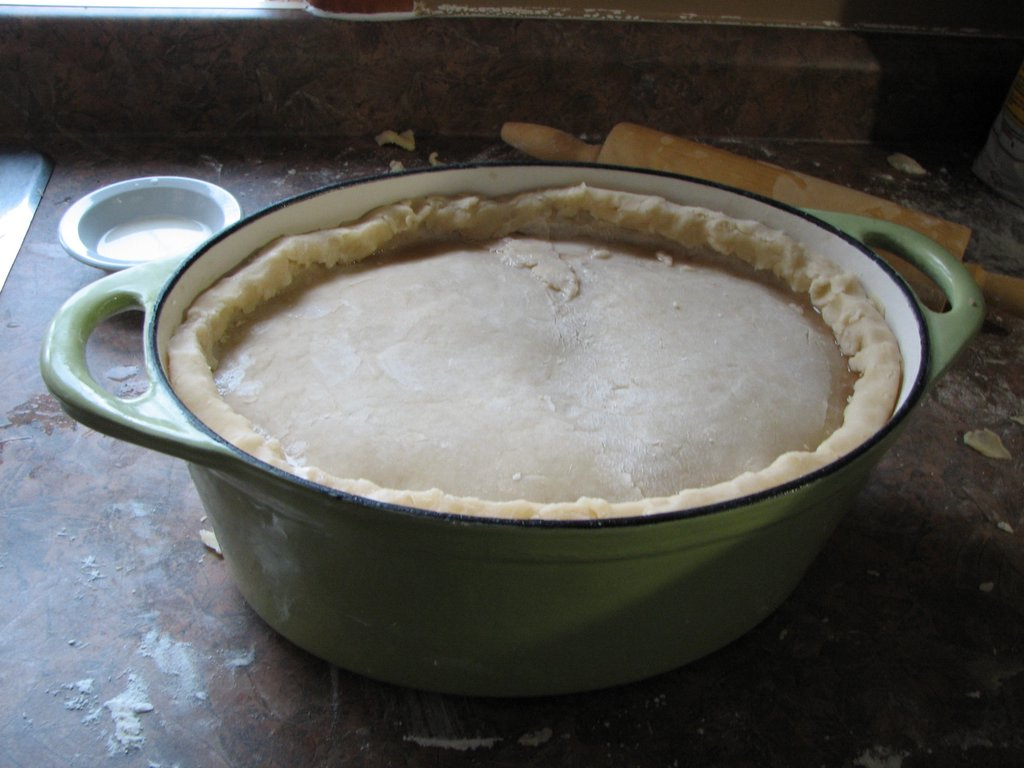
- Tourtière du Lac-Saint-Jean, ready to be put into the oven for baking
- Type: Meat pie
- Course: Main Dish
- Place of origin: Quebec, Canada
- Region or state: Quebec, Acadia, Eastern Ontario, Northeastern Ontario, French Manitoba, and New England (US)
- Serving temperature: Hot
- Main ingredients: pork, veal, beef, or fish; game meat (e.g. bear meat, rabbit meat, venison, etc.); potatoes
- Other information: Eaten: New Year's Eve, Christmas, Christmas Eve, Thanksgiving

Tourtière (Quebec French: [tuʁt͡sjaɛ̯ʁ]) is a French Canadian meat pie dish originating from the province of Quebec, made with minced pork, veal or beef and potatoes. Wild game meat such as bear or venison is sometimes used. It is a traditional part of the Christmas réveillon and New Year's Eve meal in Quebec. It is also popular in New Brunswick, and is sold in grocery stores across the rest of Canada all year long.

Tourtière is not exclusive to Quebec. It is a traditional French-Canadian dish served throughout Canada and the bordering areas of the United States. In the New England region of the US, especially in Maine, Rhode Island, Vermont, New Hampshire, and Massachusetts (e.g., Chicopee and Attleboro), late 19th and early 20th century, immigrants from Quebec introduced the dish.

There is no one correct filling; the meat depends on what is regionally available. In coastal areas, fish such as salmon is commonly used, whereas pork, beef, rabbit and game are often included inland.

Tourtière du Lac-Saint-Jean has become the traditional and iconic dish of the region of Saguenay, Quebec, since the Second World War, and it has undergone several metamorphoses.

During the 18th century, "sea pie" became popular among French and British colonists, and it seems to be "the direct forerunner of the tourtière of Lac-Saint-Jean".

Tourtière has been called "an example of 'the cuisine of the occupied,' food that is French by way of the British, who took Quebec in 1759."

== Etymology ==
Contrary to popular belief, the name "tourtière" is not derived from its filling, which is erroneously believed to originally have been the "tourte"—the French name for the passenger pigeon now extinct in North America. This can be proven in many ways, including the fact that dishes of the same name are known in certain parts of France since the 17th century, the fact that a simple metonymy explains why the pie dish has become the pie itself (not unlike casserole, which etymologically means saucepan) and the fact that language specialists disagree with the bird name etymology.

== Types of tourtière ==
=== Saguenay–Lac-Saint-Jean and Eastern Quebec ===
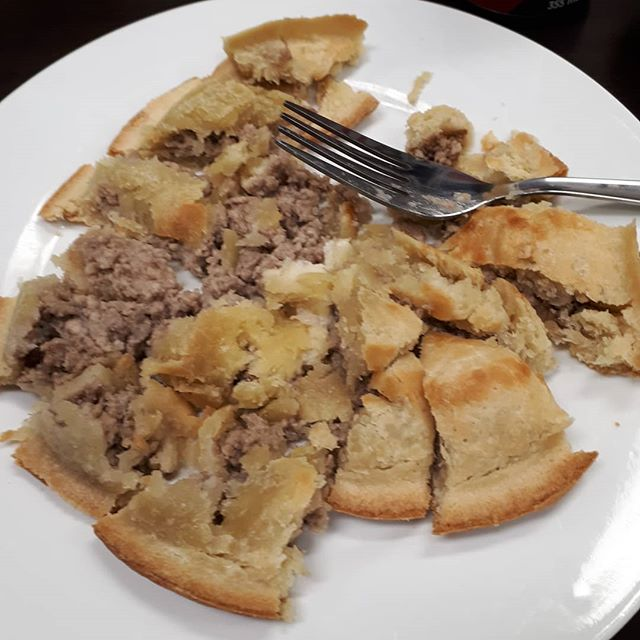
Traditional French Canadian pork meat pie

The tourtières of the Saguenay–Lac-Saint-Jean area and Eastern Quebec are slow-cooked deep-dish meat pies made with potatoes and various meats (often including wild game or turkey) cut into small cubes.

Elsewhere in Quebec and the rest of Canada, this variety of tourtière is sometimes referred to, in French and in English, as Tourtière du Lac-Saint-Jean or tourtière saguenéenne to distinguish it from the varieties of tourtière with ground meat. In the Saguenay–Lac-Saint-Jean area, however, the varieties of tourtière with ground meat are typically referred to as "pâté à la viande" ("meat pie"), while the name "tourtière" is reserved exclusively for their local variety.

=== Montreal ===
Tourtière in Montreal is made with finely ground pork only (which can be hard to find as the meat is often ground too coarsely elsewhere). Water is added to the meat after browning, and cinnamon and cloves give it a distinctive flavour. Many people use ketchup as a condiment, though the tourtière is also often eaten with maple syrup or molasses, or cranberry preserves.

Although it is less popular than the original tourtière and the tourtière du Lac-Saint-Jean, this version can also be commonly found throughout Canada and its surrounding areas.

=== Manitoba ===
Tourtière is an integral part of holiday-time meals for French Canadians in the Winnipeg neighbourhoods of St. Boniface and St. Norbert, as well as in Manitoba's rural Francophone areas. Browned meat is seasoned with varying combinations of savory, nutmeg, cloves, cinnamon, celery salt, dry mustard, salt and pepper.

=== Acadia ===
Acadian tourtière, or pâté à la viande (pâté is casserole or pie), is a pork pie that may also contain chicken, hare and beef. Pâté à la viande varies from region to region in New Brunswick, Nova Scotia and Prince Edward Island. In Petit-Rocher and Campbellton the dish is prepared in small pie plates and known as petits cochons (little pigs).

== See also ==
- Canadian cuisine
- List of pies, tarts and flans
- List of Canadian inventions and discoveries
- List of meat and potato dishes
