= Tom Tong =

Chinese entrepreneur

- Chinese: 童启华; pinyin: Tong Qihua
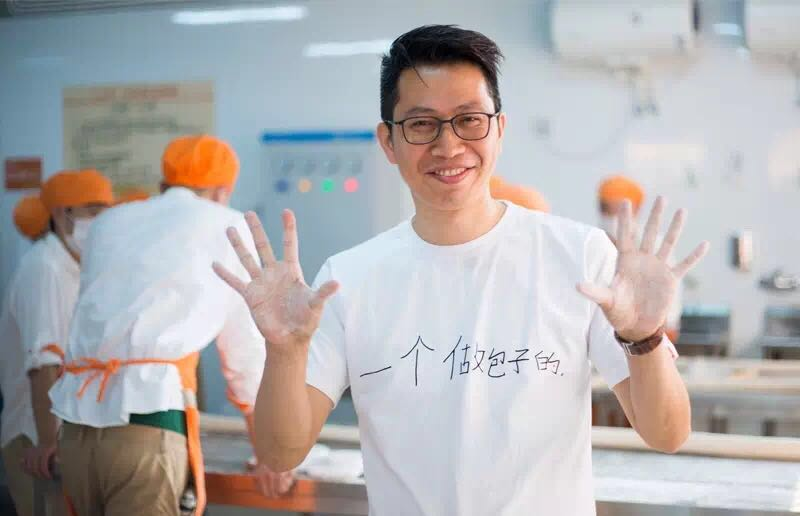
- Tom Tong at the Ganqishi training center in China (2016)
- Born: Tong Qihua; 1975 (age 50–51); Wenling, Zhejiang, China
- Education: Tongji University

Tom Tong (born 1975) is an entrepreneur, and founder of Ganqishi (甘其食) and Tom's BaoBao restaurant.

== Early life ==
Tom Tong is a native of Wenling (温岭), a seaside town in Zhejiang Province, China. This town and the surrounding region is rich in culinary, and artisanal traditions that persist into the 21st century. Tong's family moved to Shanghai when he was nine. As a child, Tong was often given bao as a treat from his grandfather as a reward for good behavior on trips to the market.

== Education ==
Tom Tong studied locomotive engineering at Tongji University, Shanghai. While Tong was a student, he founded and managed five companies including a hair salon, a shoe store, and an Internet café.

== Career ==
=== Ganqishi ===
Tom Tong founded Ganqishi

=== Tom's BaoBao ===
Tom's BaoBao was the company's American subsidiary.

==== Expanding to the US ====
Tom's BaoBao's first store opened in July 2016 in Cambridge, Massachusetts' historic Harvard Square neighborhood. Tom's BaoBao announced in October 2016 that it would also open a second location in Providence, Rhode Island, in October 2016.
