= Murcian meat pie =

Minced meat pie

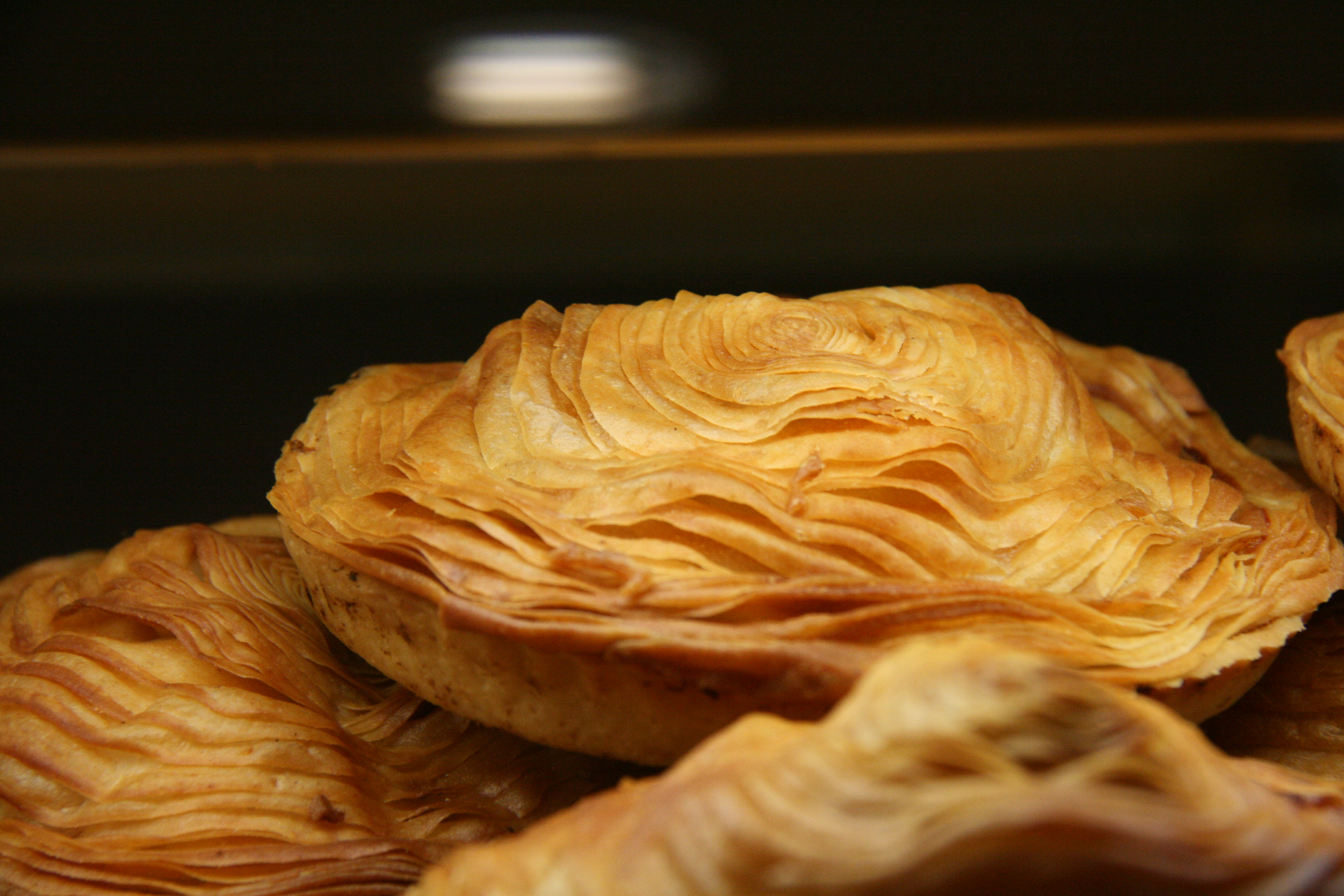
Typical Murcian meat pies.

Murcian meat pie is a type of meat pie made with puff pastry and filled with minced beef, chorizo, boiled eggs and spices. The pie originates in the Region of Murcia, Spain, particularly in the municipalities Murcia, Santomera, Cieza, Abanilla and the neighbouring town Orihuela. It has roots in Arab cuisine.

== History ==
Meat pies have been eaten in Spain since the Middle Ages. They were consumed in much of Spain and the Murcian recipe has been preserved to this day, enriched by local gastronomy. In 1695, a mandate by Charles II established the correct measurements, the quality of flour to be used and outlined exile penalties on artisans who did not comply with the standard.

Since 2009, a day is dedicated to celebrating the Murcian meat pie in Murcia each April. During this day, thousands of meat pies are distributed free of charge to the entire public in Murcia.

Due to its national fame and its tradition in regional gastronomy, it is sold across many other regions of Spain outside the Region of Murcia.

== Characteristics ==
Its circular base is made of shortcrust pastry and its upper coverage is made of fine puff pastry in the shape of a spiral. Each pie serves one person, with each pie being about 15 cm in diameter. There is a variety called "especial" that incorporates lamb brains into the basic filling.

== Local variations ==
Yecla: Murcian meat pies from here generally do not have the characteristic spiral on its top.

== See also ==
- Meat pie
