= Meat pie =

Pie with meat filling

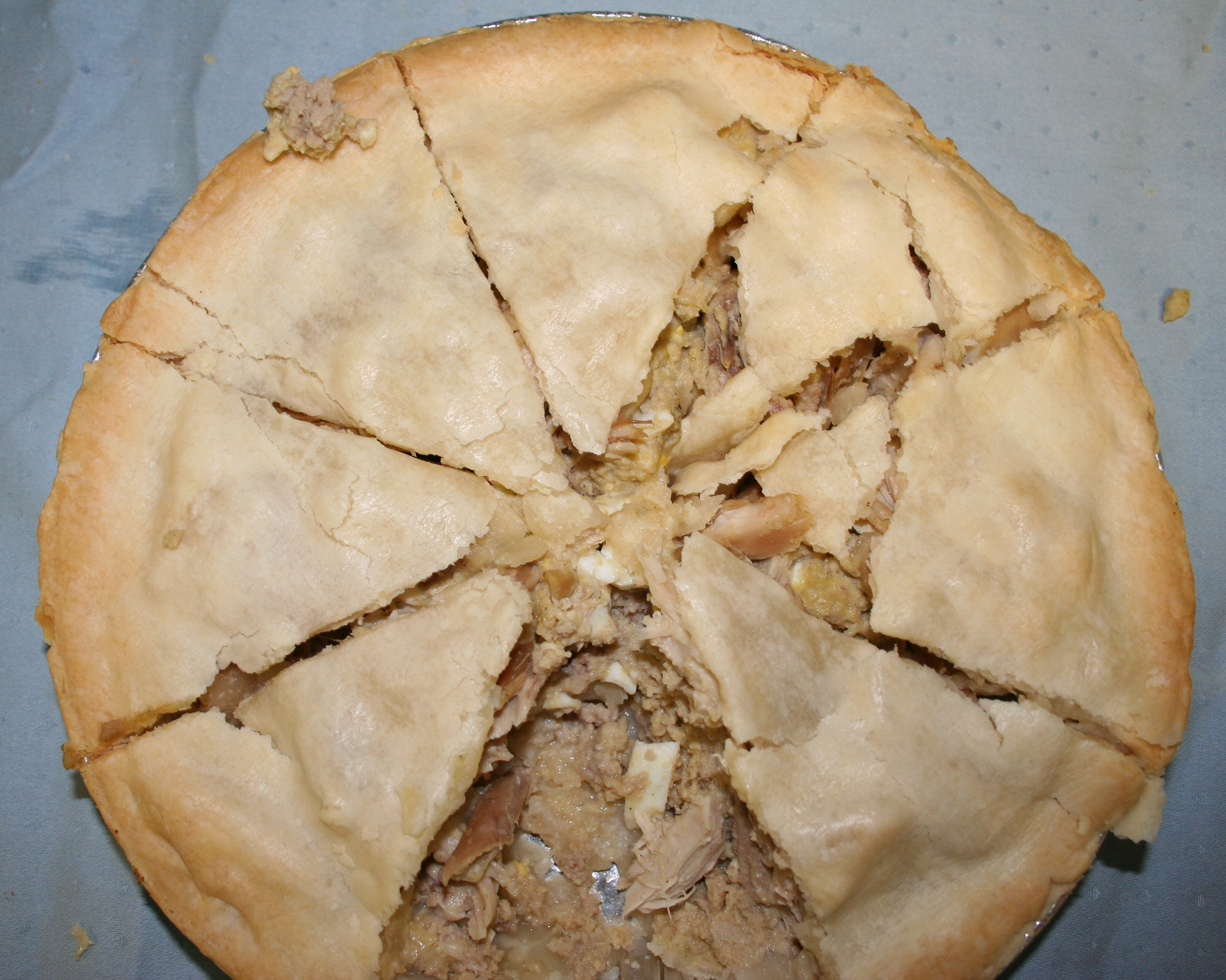
- Chicken and rabbit meat pie
- Type: Savory pie
- Main ingredients: Meat, pastry

A meat pie is a pie baked with pastry with a filling of meat and often other savory ingredients. They are found in cuisines worldwide.

Meat pies are usually baked, fried, or deep-fried to brown them and develop the flavour through the Maillard reaction. Many varieties have a flaky crust due to the incorporation of butter to develop a flaky texture when baking.

== History ==
The origins of the free form pie called galettes have been traced back to the Neolithic period, around 6000 BC. Versions of these were featured on ancient Egyptian tomb walls, and in ancient Greek and Roman texts.

The ancient Egyptians' diet featured basic pies made from oat, wheat, rye, and barley, filled with honey and baked over hot coals. The Greeks used a flour-water paste resembling pie pastry, and filled it with meat. These pies were usually fried or cooked under coals. The Romans adopted the Greek creations, using a variety of meats, oysters, mussels, lampreys, and fish as filling and a mixture of flour, oil, and water for the crust. This 'pastry' cover was not meant to be eaten and was discarded.

In Northern Europe, cooks made pastry with lard and butter to make a stiff dough that could hold an upright pie. These medieval pastry dishes were called "coffins/coffyns", that is, a basket or box, and were savory meat pies with the crusts or pastry being tall, straight-sided with sealed-on floors and lids. Open-crust pastry (not tops or lids) were known as "traps". These pies held assorted meats and sauce components and were baked more like a modern casserole with no pan (the crust itself was the pan, its pastry tough and inedible). These crusts were often made several inches thick to withstand many hours of baking.

Some historians suggest the tough crust was given to the servants while the lords and ladies of the house ate the contents.

A small African-style meat pie

This pastry became a common dish in medieval times, and by the 14th century, came to be called a "pye" or "pie". Between 1387 and 1400, Geoffrey Chaucer wrote, in The Canterbury Tales, of a cook who "koude rooste, and sethe, and broille, and frye / Máken mortreux, and wel bake a pye". The etymology of the word is unknown, but may be related to the magpie (also called "pie"), perhaps because both were spotted, or because the bird collects miscellaneous articles, and almost anything can be wrapped in pastry and cooked.

The French and Italians specialized in redefining the pastry of the pie, making it flakier and changing the taste through new methods of adding butter, rolling, and folding the dough. In 1440, the Paris pastry guild was recognized and started to expand their products—and so something like the modern day crust began to be used.

Pies were not popular in the United States until the 1800s, and today most pies in the United States are meatless and sweet, except for pot pie. In Canada, on the other hand, both English and French meat pie traditions have persisted, notably the iconic tourtière of French Canada.

== Regional variations ==
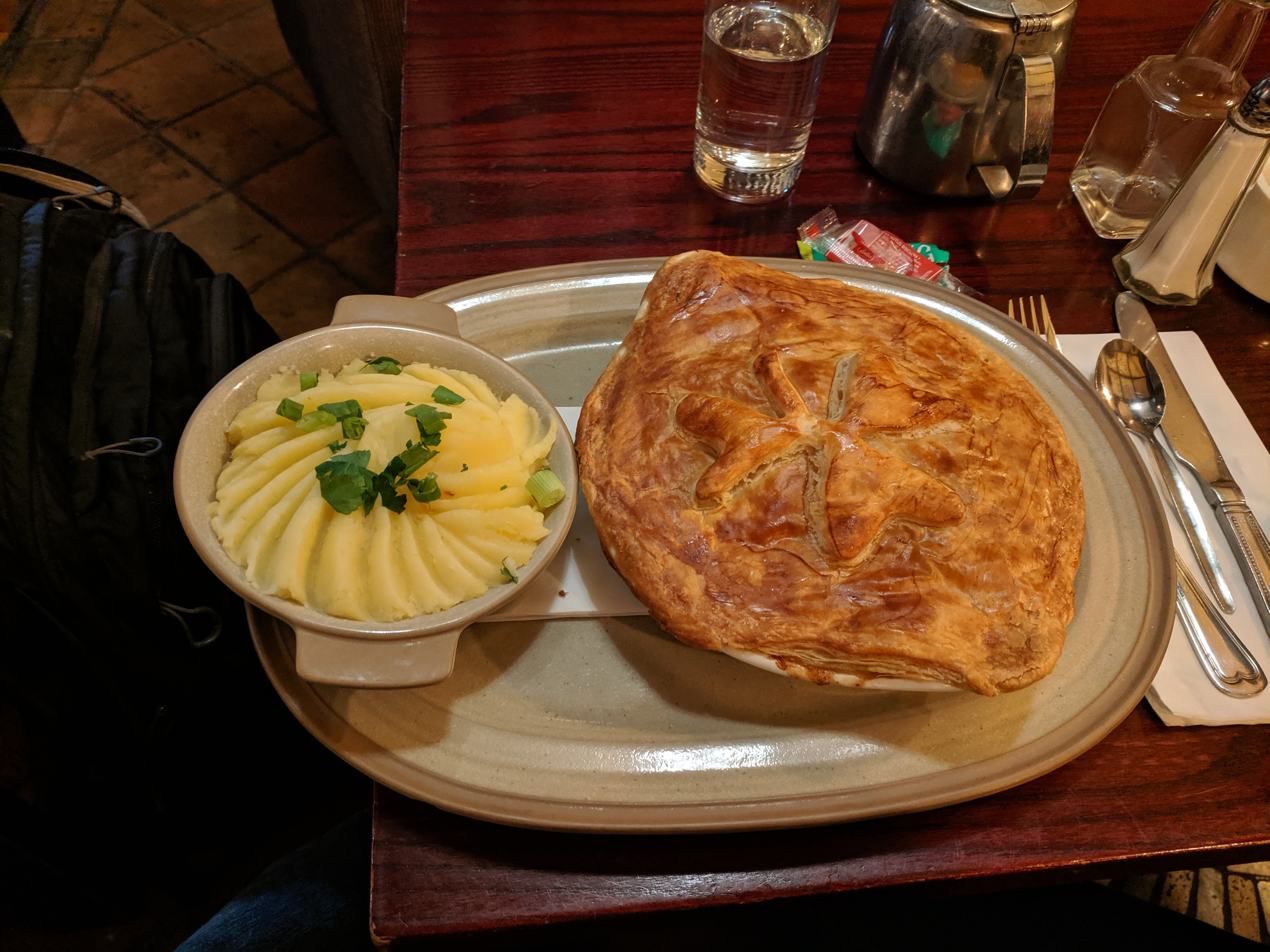
A meal of meat pie and mashed potatoes served at a Dublin pub

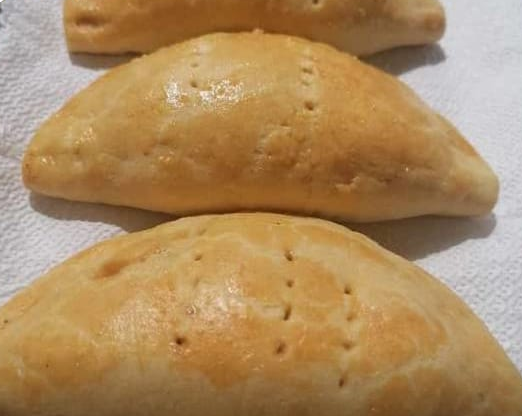
Nigerian meat pie

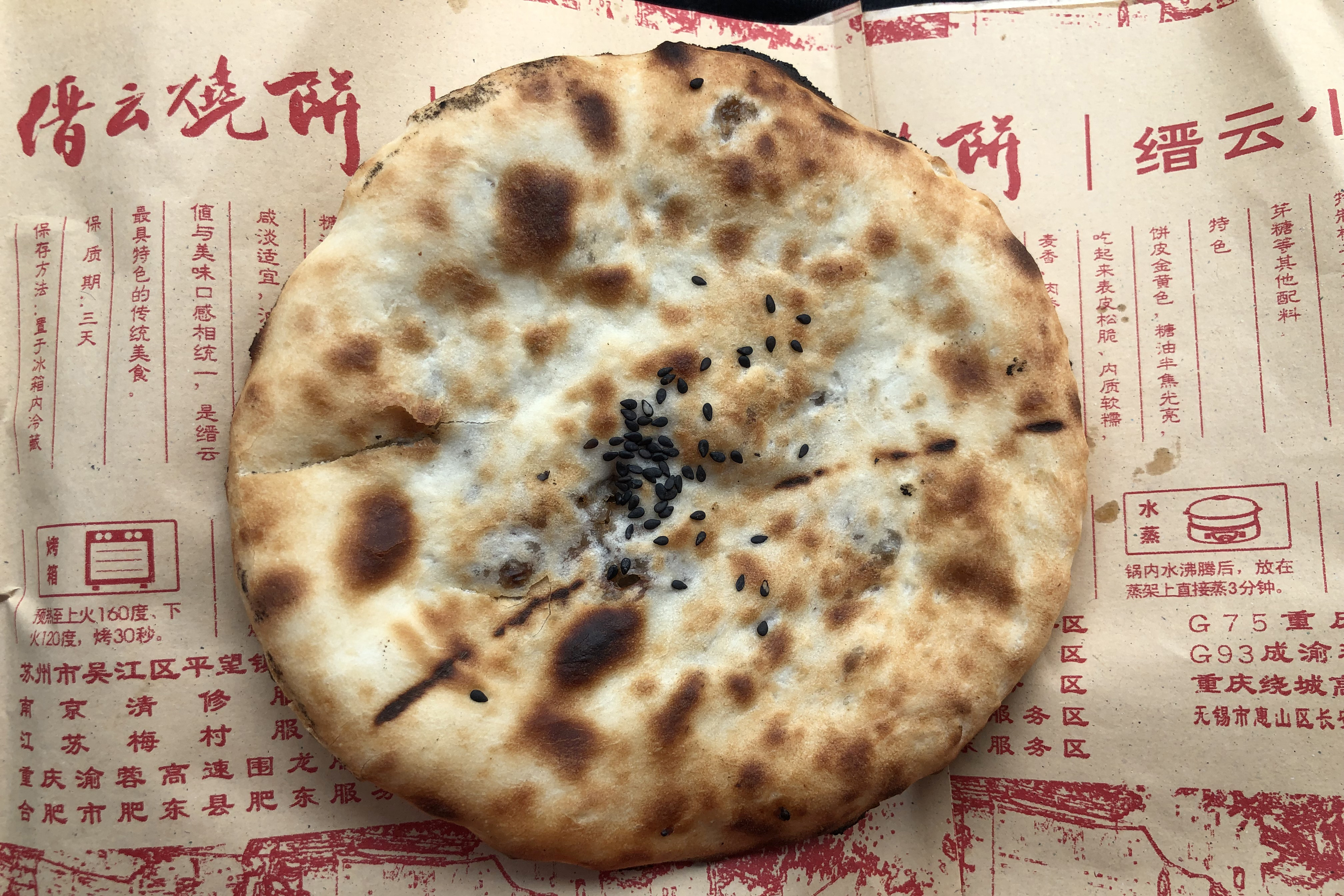
Jinyun shaobing, a meat pie originated from Jinyun County, Zhejiang, China

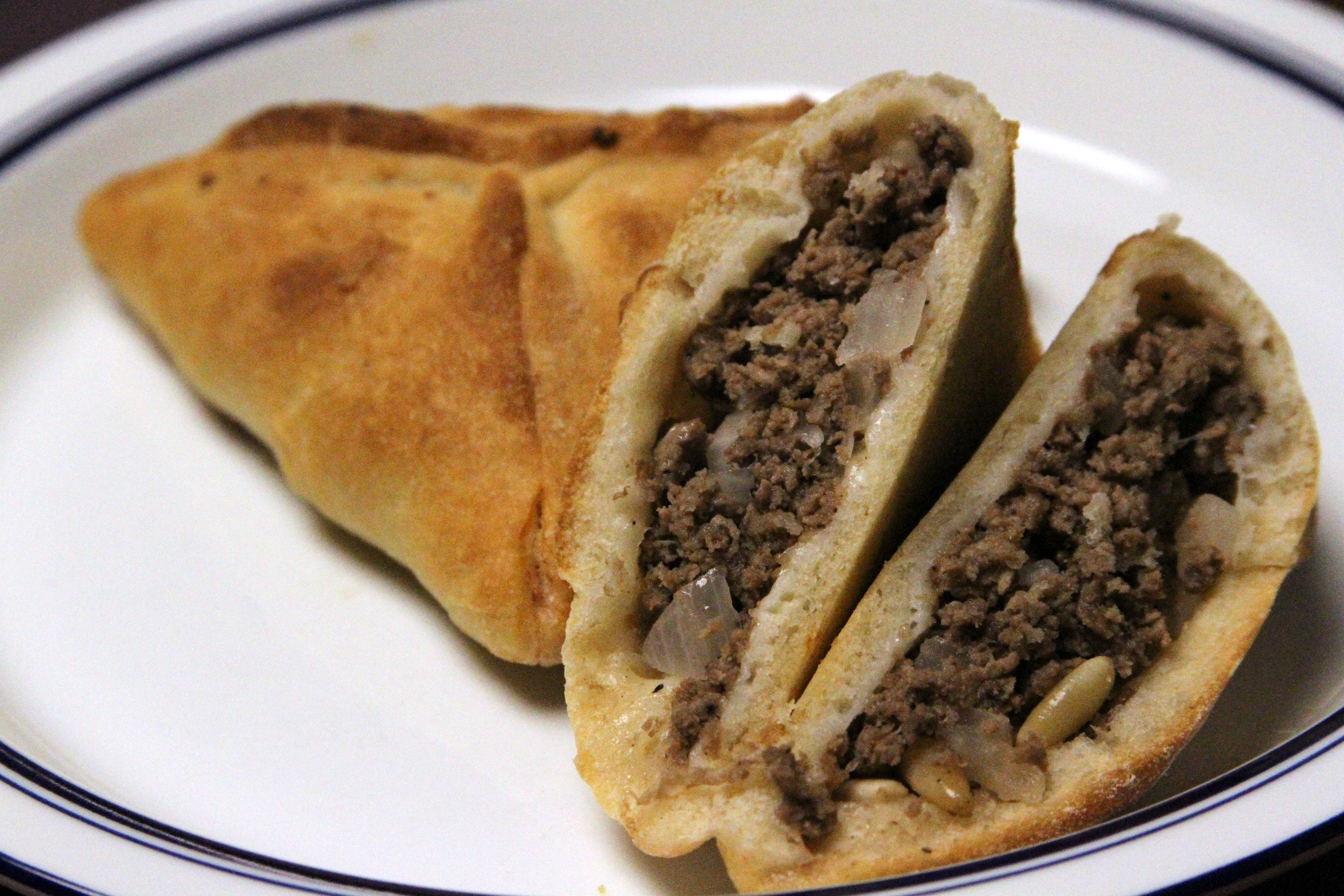
Fatayer, a meat pie in Middle Eastern cuisine

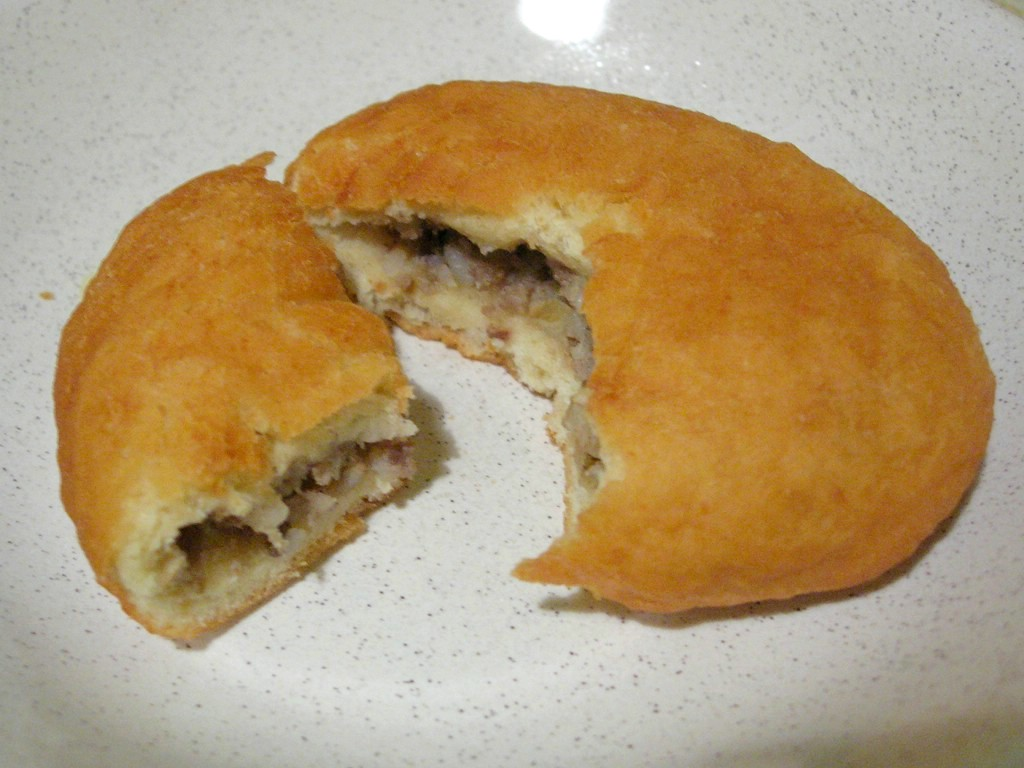
Lihapiirakka, a meat pie in Finnish cuisine

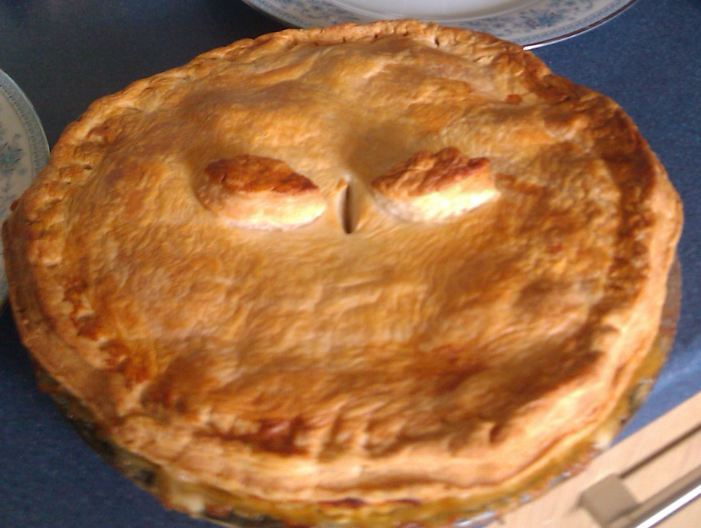
A chicken pie

The Natchitoches meat pie is one of the official state foods of the US state of Louisiana.

The Nigerian meat pie, which evolved from the pasty, is actually a turnover, can be baked or fried with varied fillings such as minced beef with potatoes and carrots.

Latin American meat empanadas may be pies or more often pasties; different pastry shells and fillings are used, and they may be baked or fried. Empanadas usually contain much onion and green or red pepper, in combination with meat or fish. Empanada dough takes many forms, from those made with cornmeal to puff pastry. Ground beef with olives, fried egg, pulled pork, diced steak, even cheese and salami are used in countries such as Chile, Argentina, Bolivia, Colombia, Ecuador, Puerto Rico and Peru.

The Australian version of Irish steak and Guinness pie has a filling of round steak with Guinness Stout Beer, bacon, and onions. It is served with potato chips and vegetables and is popular in Irish pubs. In Australia, the meat pie is a common convenience food often found in petrol stations, pubs, restaurants, bakeries, supermarkets and convenience stores.

Middle Eastern meat pies are called sfiha and contain ground beef, olive oil, plain yogurt, tahini, allspice, onion, tomatoes and pine nuts. Greek meat pies are called kreatopita and contain ground beef, onions and feta cheese. The filling for kreatopita is wrapped in phyllo dough. Indian meat pies are called samosa and usually contain peas, spiced potatoes, coriander, lentils, or ground beef or chicken and are often served with chutney.

In Turkmenistan, a meat pie is called ishlekli or a shepherd's pie. Traditionally, ishlekli was baked by shepherds, who buried it in the hot sand of the Turkmen desert and coals. Today, ishlekli is mostly baked in the oven, but the traditional method is still preserved by the Turkmen shepherds.

== See also ==
- Baozi
- Börek
- Clam pie
- Empanada
- Fish pie
- Flipper pie
- Game pie
- Haitian patty
- Hujiao bing
- Humble pie
- Lihapiirakka
- Meat pie (Australia and New Zealand)
- Murcian meat pie
- Pasty
- Pâté chaud
- Pie floater
- Pork pie
- Pot pie
- Rabbit pie
- Rapure
- Scotch pie
- Sea-pie
- Steak and kidney pie
- Steak pie
- Tourtière

== Bibliography ==
- "History of Pies". What's Cooking America. 19 May 2015. N.p., n.d. Web. 22 Mar. 2011.
