= Kalakukko =

Finnish savoury pie

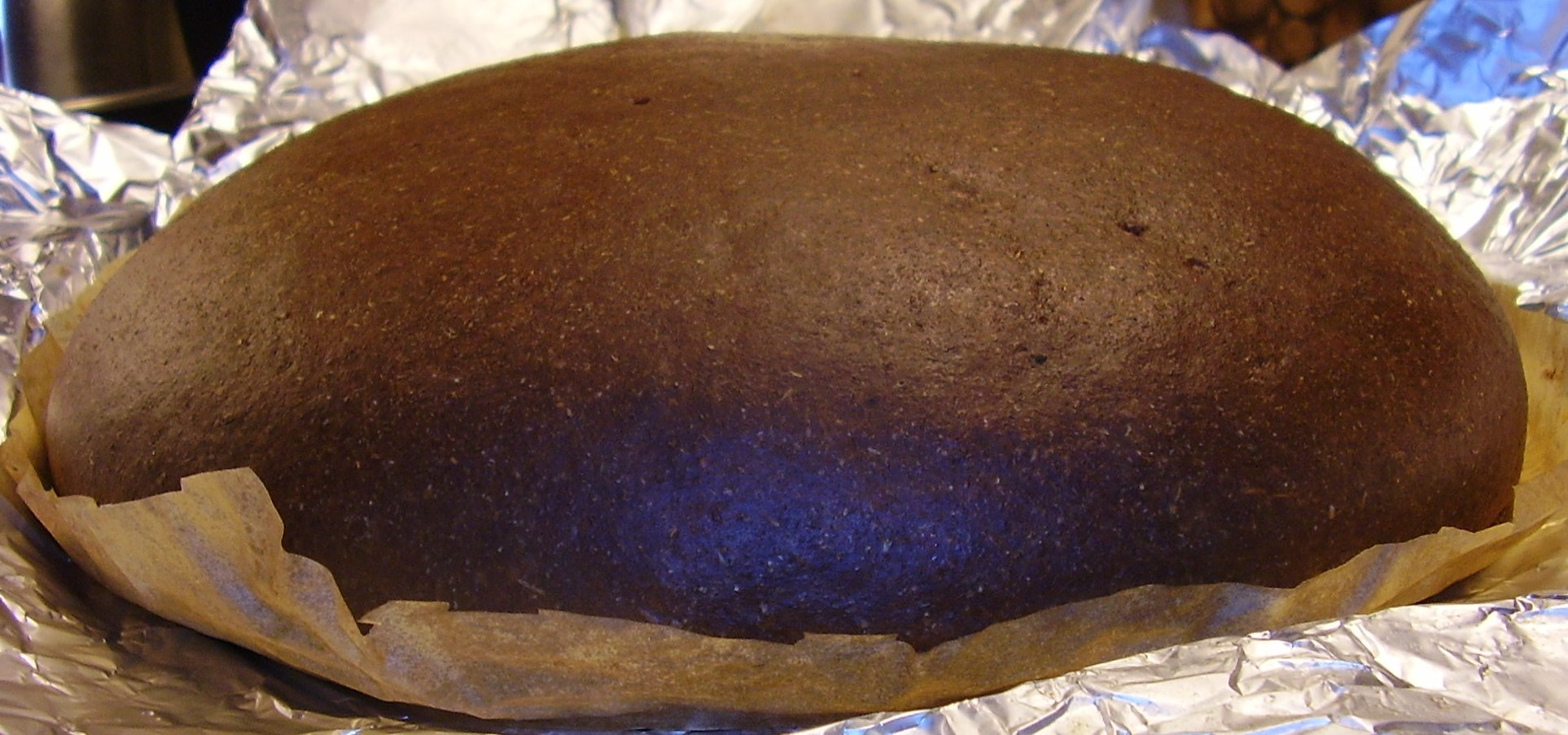
- Type: Savoury pie
- Place of origin: Finland
- Region or state: Northern Savonia
- Main ingredients: Bread (rye flour), fish (usually vendace, European perch, or salmon)

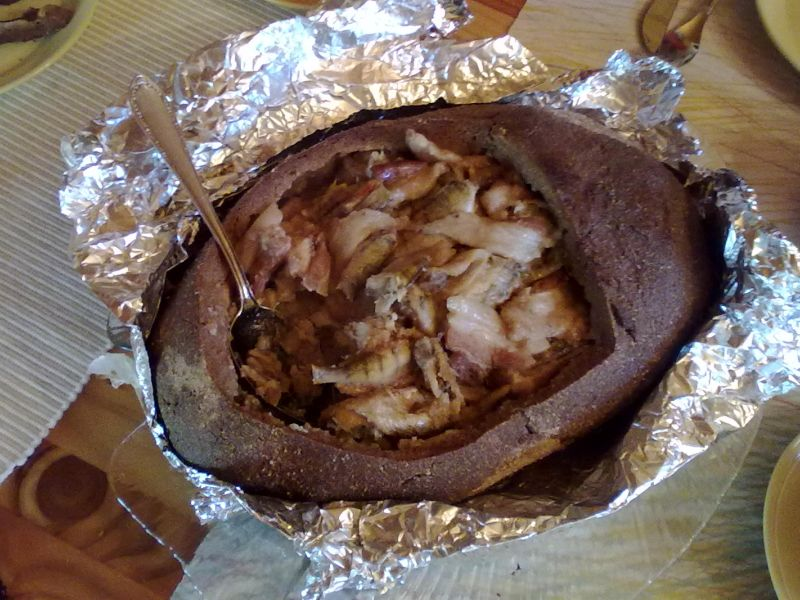
Kalakukko opened

Kalakukko (Finnish: [ˈkɑlɑˌkukːo]) is a traditional Finnish dish from the region of Savonia made from fish (e.g., perch, vendace, loach, smelt, or salmon) baked inside a loaf of bread. Kalakukko is especially popular in Kuopio, capital city of the Northern Savonia region. Kuopio is home to many kalakukko bakeries. The city also hosts an annual kalakukko baking contest.

== Flour ==
Traditionally, kalakukko is prepared with rye flour (like ruisleipä), although wheat is often added to make the dough more pliable. The filling consists of fish, pork and bacon, and is seasoned with salt (unless the pork is already salted). After being baked for several hours, traditionally in a masonry oven, kalakukko looks much like a large loaf of rye bread. If prepared correctly, bones of the fish soften and the meat and fish juices cook thoroughly inside the bread. This results in a moist filling.

== Fish ==
Traditionally, the fish used in kalakukko is either vendace (Finnish: muikku), or European perch (Finnish: ahven). Sometimes, salmon is used. In southern Savonia the vendace is advocated as the only fish for the true kalakukko whereas in the northern parts of the province the same is said about the perch. Instead of fish, combinations of potato and pork, or rutabaga and pork are also used. The appropriate drink to accompany kalakukko is buttermilk or piimä.

Kalakukko will keep for a long time when unopened. It used to be a practical lunch for workers away from home.

== Serving ==
Kalakukko can be reheated in an oven. It takes about one hour in 130 °C (266 °F) if the size of the kalakukko is about 1 kilogram (2.2 lb). It can also be eaten cold. The usual way to eat kalakukko is to open the top with a sharp knife, eat the top with butter, and then slice some of the bread making the hole on the top larger and eat it with the filling.

== Etymology ==
Some Finnish speakers today find the name kalakukko somewhat amusing, as kala is Finnish for "fish" and kukko is "rooster", leading to the often used but non-morphological translation, "fish cock". Previous theories suggested that the archaic form of kukko is derived from the same root as kukkaro (purse). Kukko also might come from a Finnish word of kukkula, hill, because the dish is elevated. However, in 2008 new research demonstrated that kukko is a loan from Low German and shares the same origin as modern German kochen (to cook) and English cake.

Kalakukko obtained Traditional Speciality Guaranteed (TSG) status in Europe in 2002.

== Hanna Partanen's kalakukko bakery ==
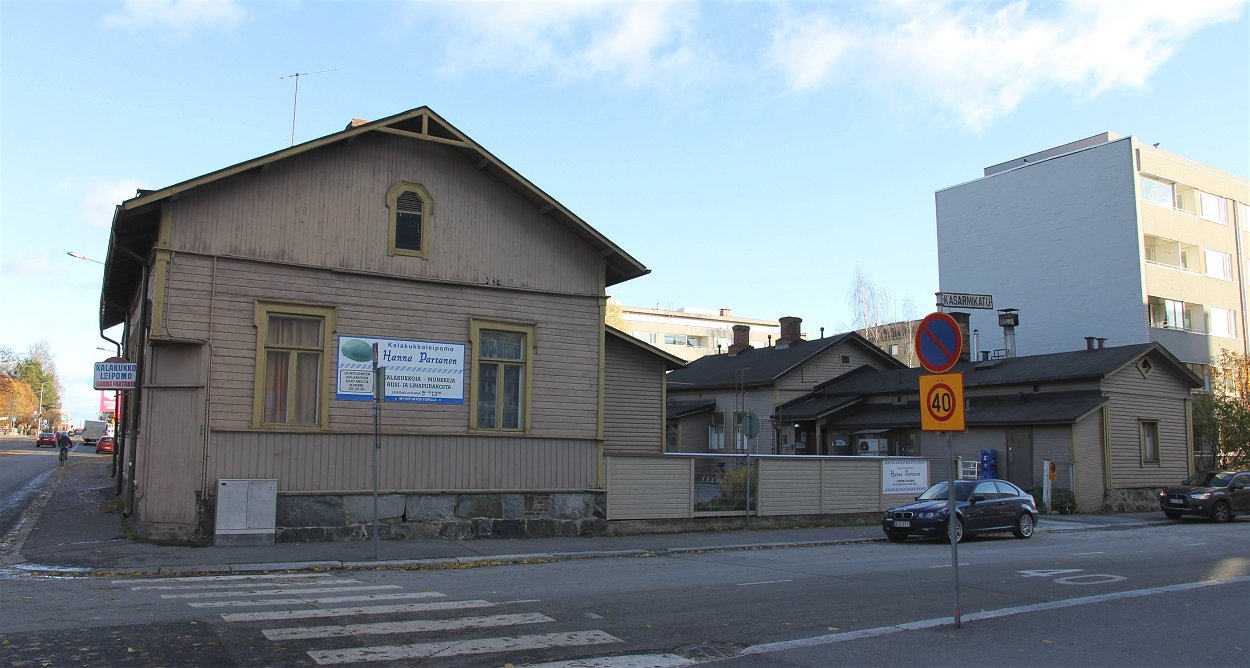
Hanna Partanen's kalakukko bakery at Kasarmikatu 15 in Kuopio.

Hanna Partanen's (1891–1969) kalakukko bakery in Kuopio, Northern Savonia was Finland's most famous kalakukko bakery at its time. Famous guests have included American presidents and Soviet leaders along with President of Finland Urho Kekkonen. The bakery still bakes kalakukko by hand from Finnish materials in the same central location at Kasarmikatu 15 in Kuopio. The bakery is currently run by Hanna's grandson Lauri Partanen and employs 10 to 20 people depending on the season.

== See also ==
- Lihapiirakka
- Lörtsy
- Finnish cuisine
