= Lörtsy =

Finnish pastry

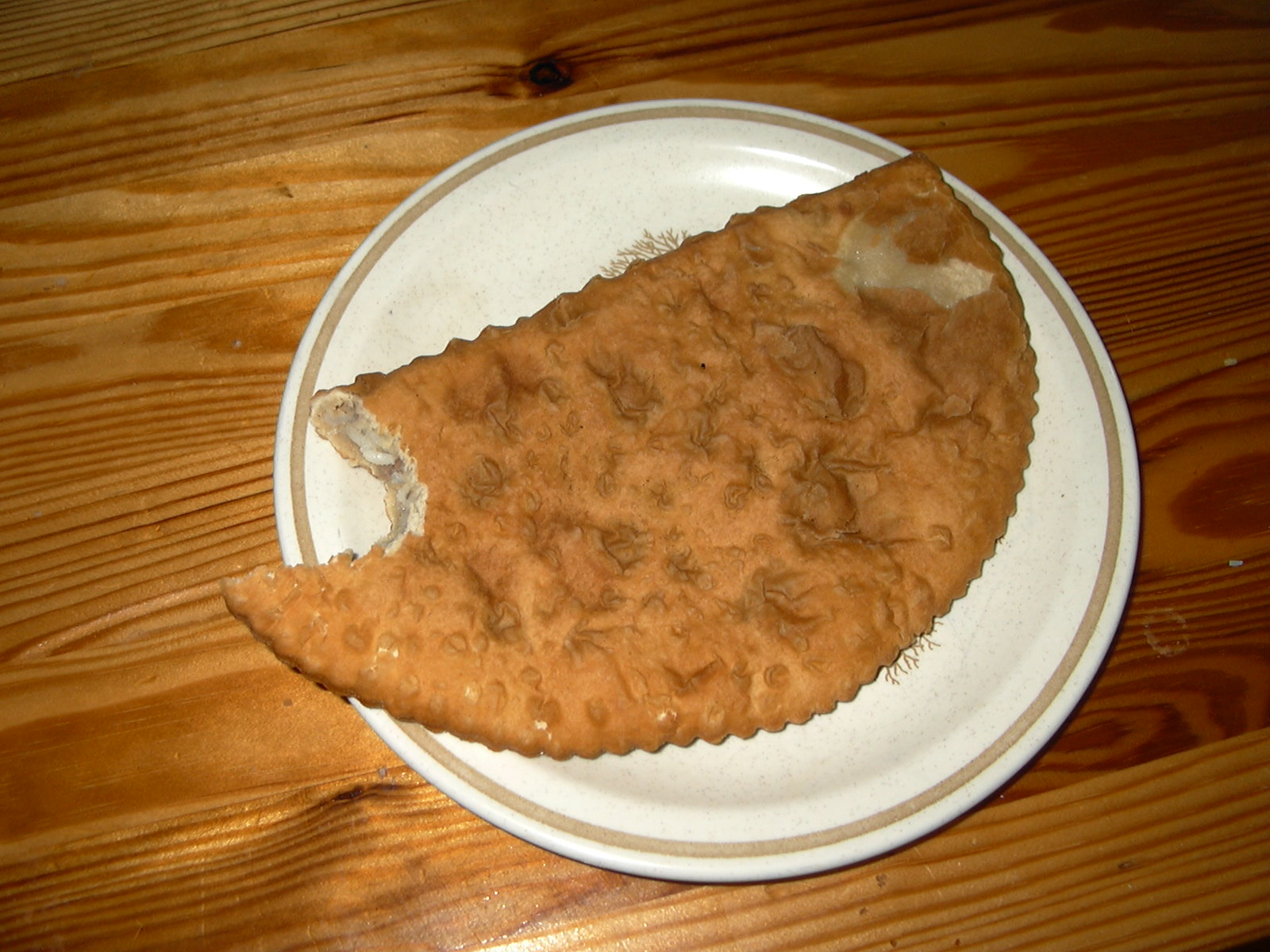
- A meat lörtsy
- Course: Appetizer, main, dessert (jam version)
- Place of origin: Finland
- Region or state: South Savo
- Serving temperature: Hot
- Variations: Multiple, most common are meat and rice or apple jam.

Lörtsy (Finnish pronunciation: [ˈlørtsy]) is a thin, half-moon shaped pastry originally invented in Savonlinna, eastern Finland. It can be made with a variety of fillings; the most common ones are either a savoury meat filling or a sweet apple filling.

A meat lörtsy contains a meat and rice filling similar to the Finnish meat pie. Street vendors may offer it with the same condiments as the meat pie, such as a pickled cucumber and chopped raw onion, and with an optional hot dog sausage. When served with condiments on the street, it is folded around them like a taco.

The apple lörtsy contains a sweet apple jam, and resembles a jam doughnut.

The lörtsy is associated with eastern Finland, particularly the region of South Savo, but nowadays can be found all over Finland from street vendors and in some supermarkets.

== See also ==
- Kalakukko
