= Sea-pie =

North American dish originating in Britain

- Alternative names: Cipaille, cipâtes, six-pâtes
- Type: Meat pie
- Place of origin: British America, New France (United States and Canada)
- Region or state: New England, New Brunswick, Nova Scotia, Quebec, Maine
- Main ingredients: Meat or fish

Sea-pie is a layered meat pie made with meat or fish, and is known to have been served to British sailors during the 18th century. Its popularity was passed on to the New England colonies sufficiently to be included in Amelia Simmons's landmark 1796 book American Cookery. Sea-pie is made by lining a saucepan or pot with a thick layer of pastry, and then filling the pot with alternating layers of meat (such as pork, beef, fish, or pigeon) or stew, and vegetables; and, topping the layered ingredients with pastry. There is no set list of ingredients; rather, sea-pie is made with whatever meat and vegetables are on-hand at the time it is made.

In Quebec, this dish is called cipaille, cipâtes or six-pâtes (in French), and is a traditional Quebecois dish. It contains no fish or other seafood, but moose, partridge, hare, beef, veal, pork, and chicken (or a simpler combination of these). The French name originated as an adaptation of sea-pie.

== See also ==
- Canadian cuisine
- List of pies, tarts and flans
- Steak and oyster pie
- Tourtière
