= Steak pie =

British meat pie

Steak Pie
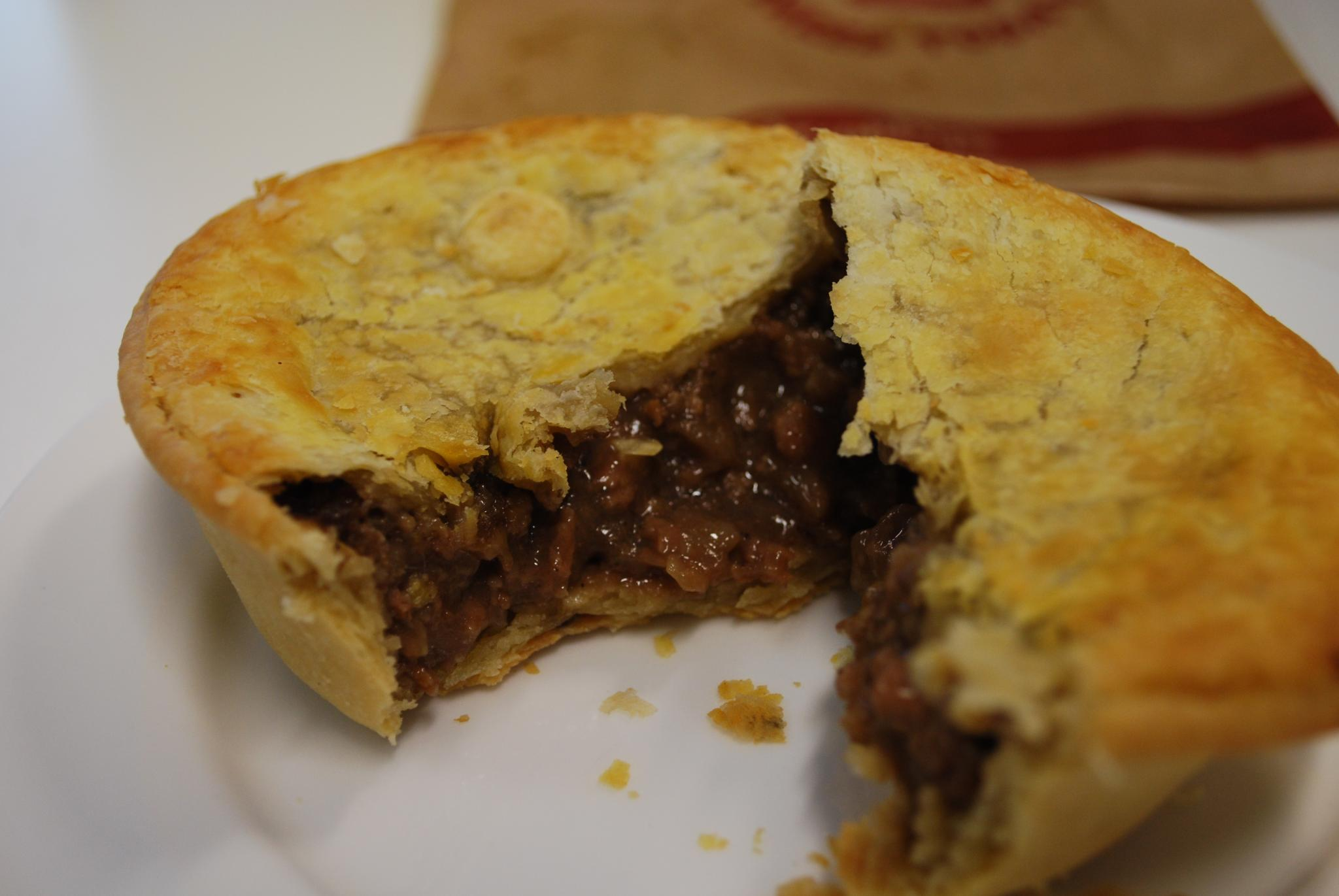
- Steak and onion pie
- Type: Meat pie
- Place of origin: United Kingdom
- Main ingredients: Steak, beef gravy, pastry shell
- Variations: Steak pie supper

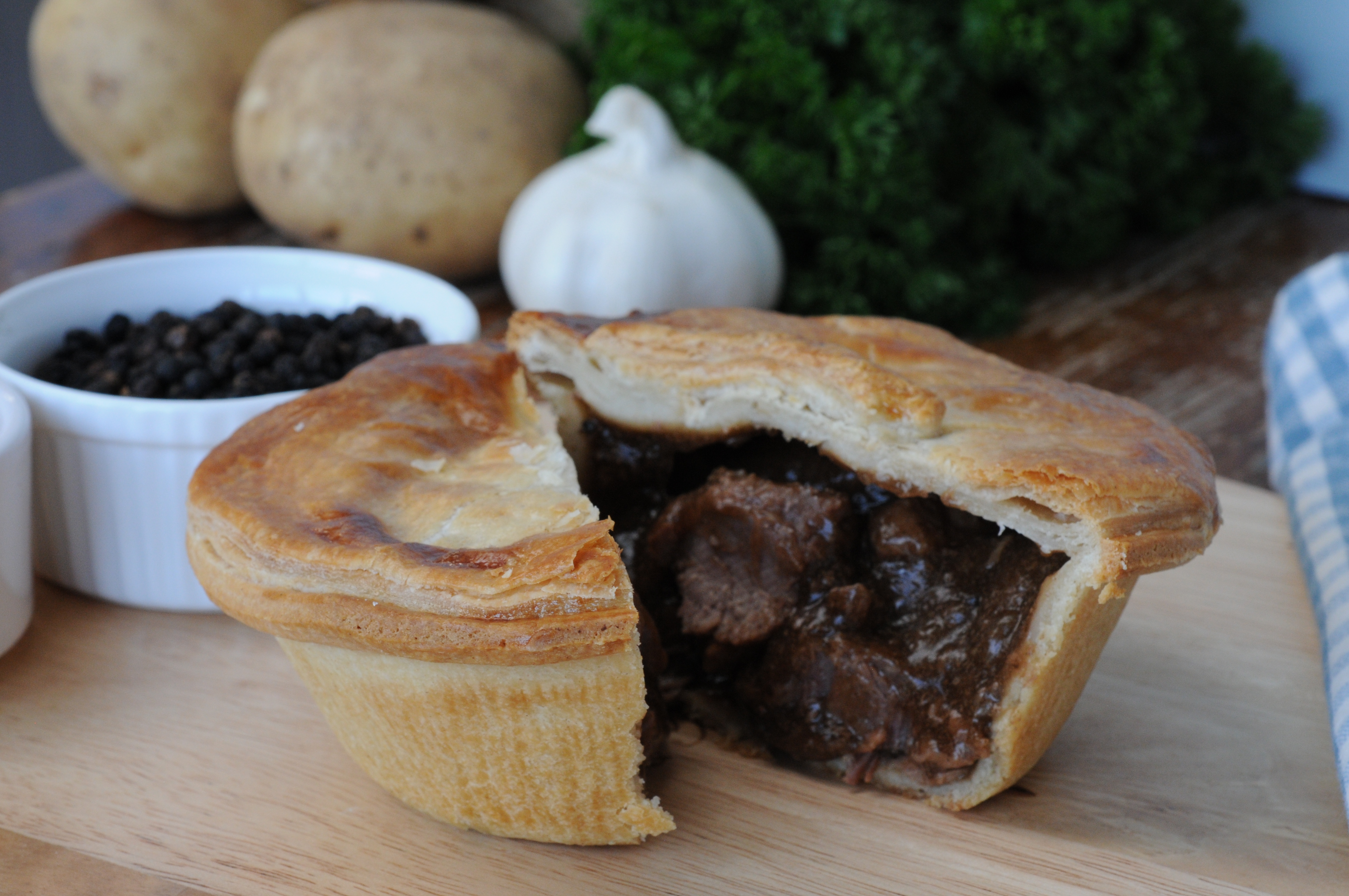
A handmade steak and ale pie. A very traditional English pie flavour

A steak pie is a traditional meat pie served in Britain. It is made from stewing steak and beef gravy, enclosed in a pastry shell. Sometimes mixed vegetables are included in the filling. The dish is often served with "chunky chips" (thickly sliced potatoes fried, sometimes in beef dripping).

Steak pies are also available from chip shops, served with normal chips, referred to in Scotland as a steak pie supper. A steak pie supper is usually accompanied by salt and vinegar; however, around Edinburgh, a combination of spirit vinegar and brown sauce, known simply as "sauce" or "chippie sauce", is popular. The precise proportions of each ingredient are unique to each take-away. Some Fish and Chip shops, particularly in Scotland, heat precooked frozen pies by dropping them into the deep fat fryer.

Throughout the UK, meat pies are a traditional hot food eaten at football games either before kick-off or during half time. So synonymous is the meat pie with football in the UK, at the British Pie Awards an award is given for Best Football Pie.

Many Scots celebrate Ne'erday ("New Year's Day") with a dinner of steak pie.

== Varieties ==
Other types of steak pie are available around the world, including in Australia and New Zealand. In Ireland, Guinness Stout is commonly added along with bacon and onions, and the result is commonly referred to as a Steak and Guinness Pie (or Guinness Pie for short). A Steak and Ale pie is a similar creation, popular in British pubs, using one of a variety of ales in place of the Guinness.

== See also ==
- List of pies, tarts and flans
