= Pot pie =

Meat pie made with flaky pastry

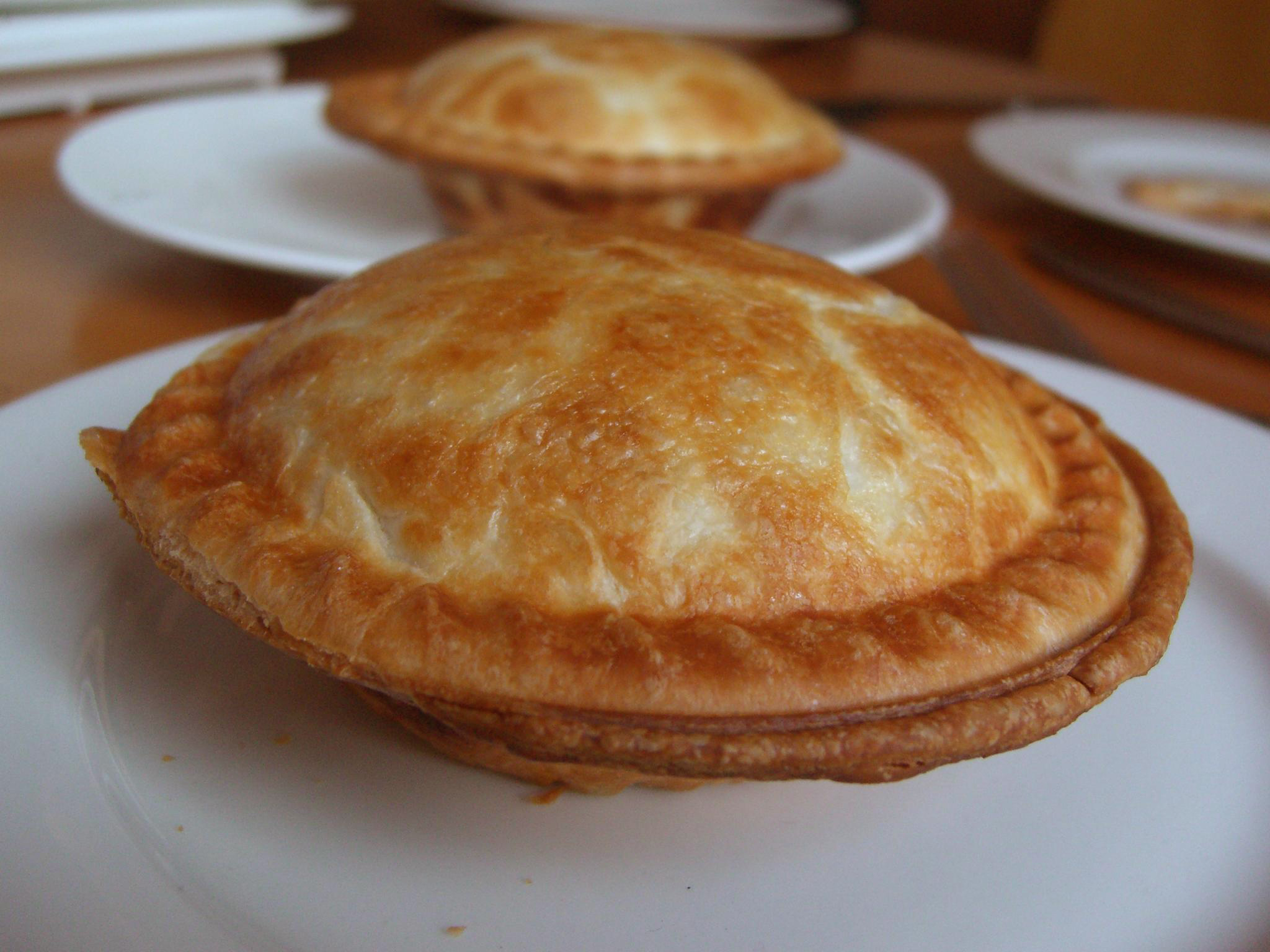
- Type: Savory pie
- Place of origin: United Kingdom
- Region or state: England
- Main ingredients: Meat (beef, chicken, lamb or turkey), gravy, mixed vegetables (potatoes, carrots, green beans, peas and corn)

A pot pie or potpie is a type of savory pie that is popular in the United States. It is usually a meat pie, covered by a pie crust consisting of flaky pastry. Pot pies may be made with a variety of fillings, including poultry, beef, seafood or meat alternative fillings, and may also differ in the types of crust. The name is chiefly used in America.

== Origin ==
In the 16th century, the English gentry revived the custom of serving pies and the tradition soon swept the country. This led a British food writer to describe them as deer meat "which they bake in pasties, and this venison pasty is a dainty rarely found in any other kingdom." The meat pies made by the English of that era (called pot pies in North America) included various meats, such as pork, lamb, birds and game. During the reign of Elizabeth I, English cooks made pies using "chicken peepers", which consisted of chicks stuffed with gooseberries. Soon after the pies spread across Europe, early European American settlers took them to the New World.

== Preparation ==
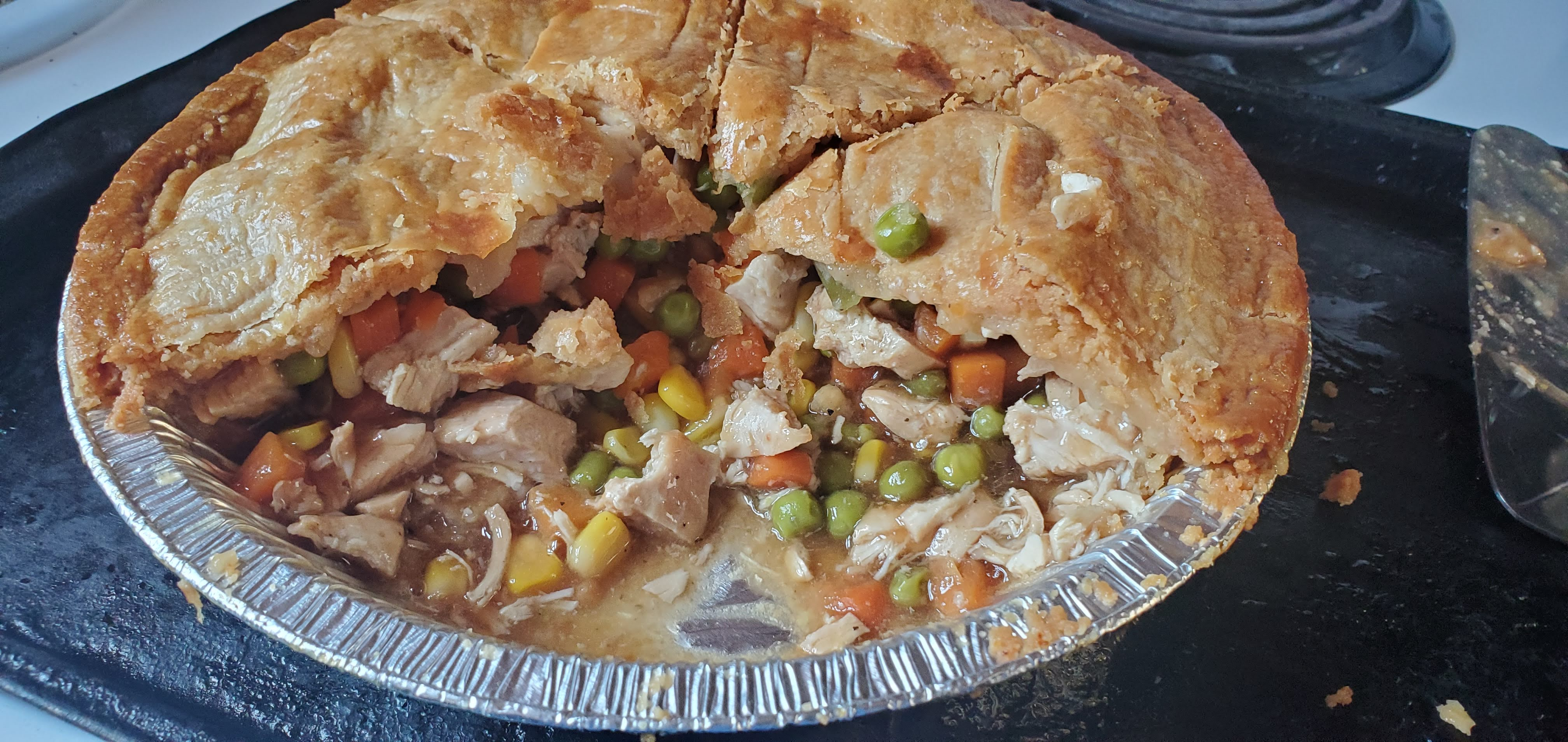
Homemade chicken and vegetable pot pie, cut open

Pot pie can be prepared in a variety of ways including in a baking dish in an oven, or in a pie iron over a campfire. There are numerous other types of pot pies including taco, coconut curry chicken, and steak and mushroom. The pie shell and crust can be made from scratch or can be fashioned from store-bought pie crust or biscuit dough and includes ingredients such as butter, lard, olive oil, flour, and shortening. Once prepared and served, the pot pie leftovers can be stored in the freezer for later consumption.

== Pennsylvania Dutch pot pie ==
In the Pennsylvania Dutch region, some people make a dish called "bot boi" (or "bottboi") by Pennsylvania German-speaking natives. Pennsylvania Dutch pot pie is a different definition of pot pie: a stew without a full crust, but with a biscuit topping that is traditionally baked directly atop the stew, in similar manner to a cobbler casserole. Most commonly made with chicken, it usually includes homemade dumpling-style dough noodles and potatoes, and sometimes vegetables, such as carrots or celery.

== See also ==
- American cuisine
- British cuisine
