= Kadir Nurman =

Turkish-German restaurateur

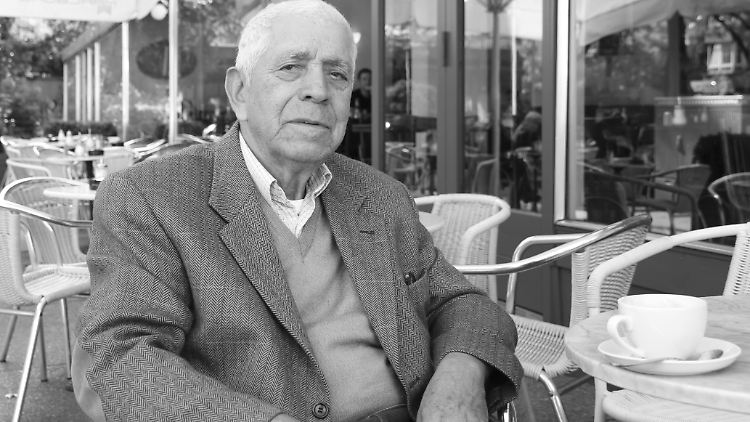
- Born: 1933; Istanbul, Turkey
- Died: 24 October 2013 (aged 79–80); Berlin, Germany
- Occupation: Restaurateur
- Known for: Introduction in Germany of the fast-food sandwich known as the "kebab" or Döner, made with traditional Turkish döner kebab

Kadir Nurman (c.1933 – 24 October 2013) was a Turkish restaurateur, widely credited with having in 1972, in West Berlin, introduced or "invented" the fast food sandwich commonly known as the "kebab" (German: der Döner), consisting of traditional Turkish döner kebab meat stuffed together with mixed salad into a flatbread. Nurman received a lifetime achievement award from the Association of Turkish Döner Manufacturers in 2011. Afterwards, Nurman told the German magazine Frankfurter Rundschau that he was unhappy with modern döner kebab sandwiches, as "there are too many ingredients" in them.

Several people have been credited with being the "inventor of the döner kebab" in Germany, but such claims – including that for Nurman – are widely considered inaccurate. The familiar rotating döner kebab meat, roasted on a vertical spit and sliced with a sword, has been well known in Turkey since the mid-19th century. Its invention is attributed to the town of Bursa, and often credited to İskender Efendi; though it has also been ascribed to a cook named Hamdi, decades earlier in Kastamonu.

Introduced in Nurman's native Istanbul in the 1940s by restaurateurs such as Beyti Güler, it became a world-famous delicacy. Döner kebab has been sold in sandwich form there since at least the mid-1960s. The Greek gyro, was already a popular sandwich item in Athens and in New York City by 1971. Nurman himself did not claim to be the first person to have sold a sandwich of döner kebab meat even in Germany, saying in German: "Maybe someone else also did it, in some hidden corner, but no one noticed. The kebab became well-known through me."

Nevertheless, Nurman’s early kebab shop at West Berlin’s central railway station is widely regarded as an early example of a trend that later spread internationally. His approach to the dish influenced the development of the Berlin-style döner kebab within the Turkish Gastarbeiter community, a variant that later became one of the most popular fast foods in Germany and across much of Europe, before spreading globally.

== Life ==
Nurman was born in Istanbul, Turkey. He emigrated to Stuttgart, Germany in 1960, aged 26, and moved to West Berlin in 1966. In 1972 he set up a fast food stall at Zoologischer Garten railway station. With the idea that busy workers might like a portable meal, Nurman sold grilled meat and salad inside a flat bread. Though he did not become wealthy from his widely imitated shop, Nurman later said he was happy that so many Turkish people were able to make a living selling kebabs. At the time of his death, there were approximately 16,000 döner outlets in Germany, with over 2.5 billion euros ($3.3 billion) in annual sales.
