= Dürüm =

Turkish wrap

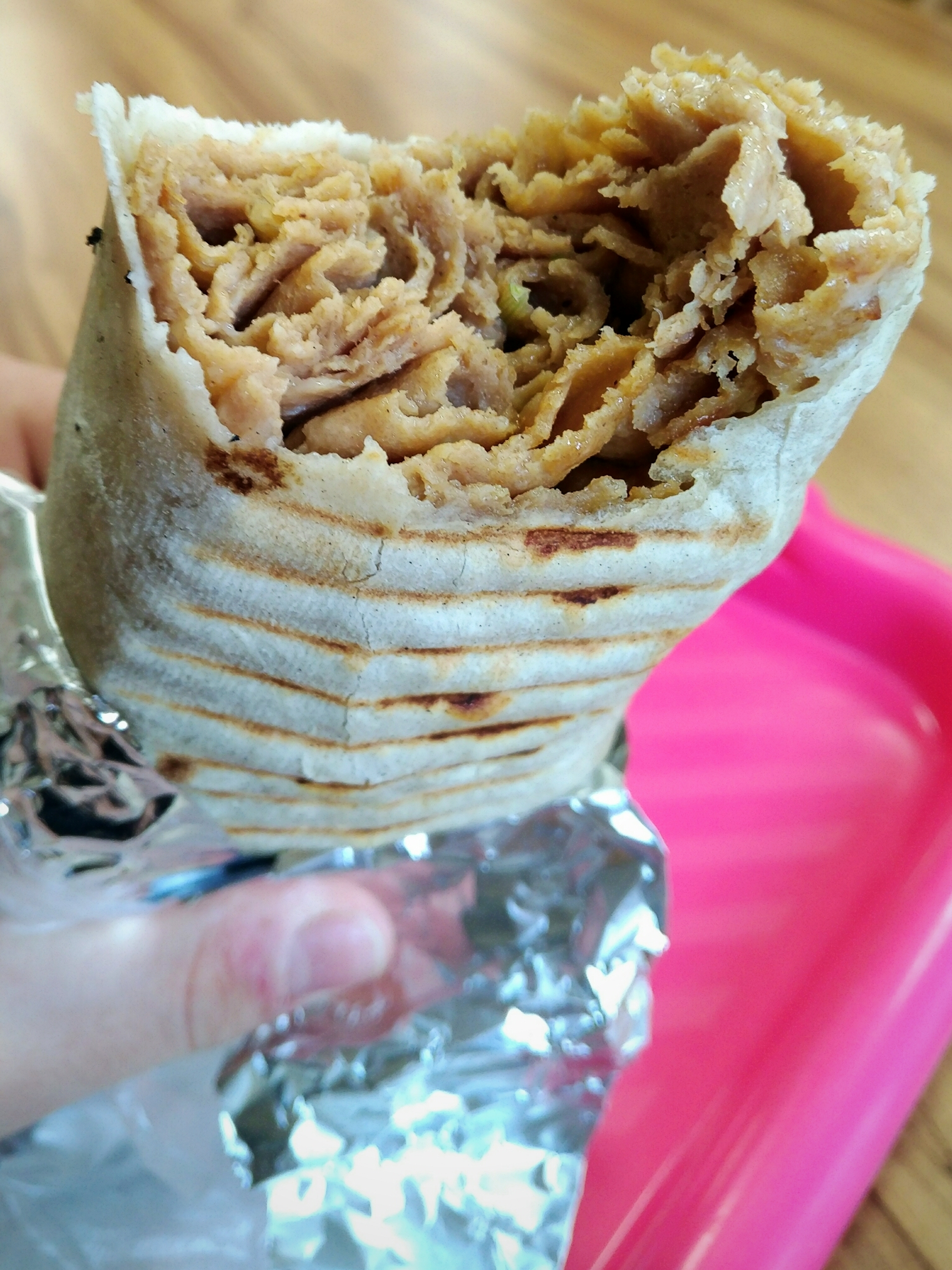
Döner kebab as dürüm

A dürüm (Turkish pronunciation: [dyˈɾym], "roll") or dürme is a wrap that is usually filled with typical döner kebab ingredients. The wrap is made from lavash or yufka flatbreads. It is common as a street food in Turkey and many other European countries, but can also be found in sit-down restaurants.
It is usually more expensive than a normal döner. Some people prefer it to the döner, either because the portion is bigger or because the fillings-to-bread-ratio is higher in a dürüm.
Most döner-joints in Germany where the bread is freshly-baked use the same leavened dough-portion as for the döner bun, but rolled out into a flatbread wrap.
Another variation is made from a reheated lahmacun, filled with the same ingredients as the döner kebab, rolled up as a dürüm.

== See also ==
- Burrito
- Donair
- Gyros
- Roti
- Shawarma
