= German Doner Kebab =

Fast casual kebab chain based in Glasgow

German Doner Kebab (GDK)

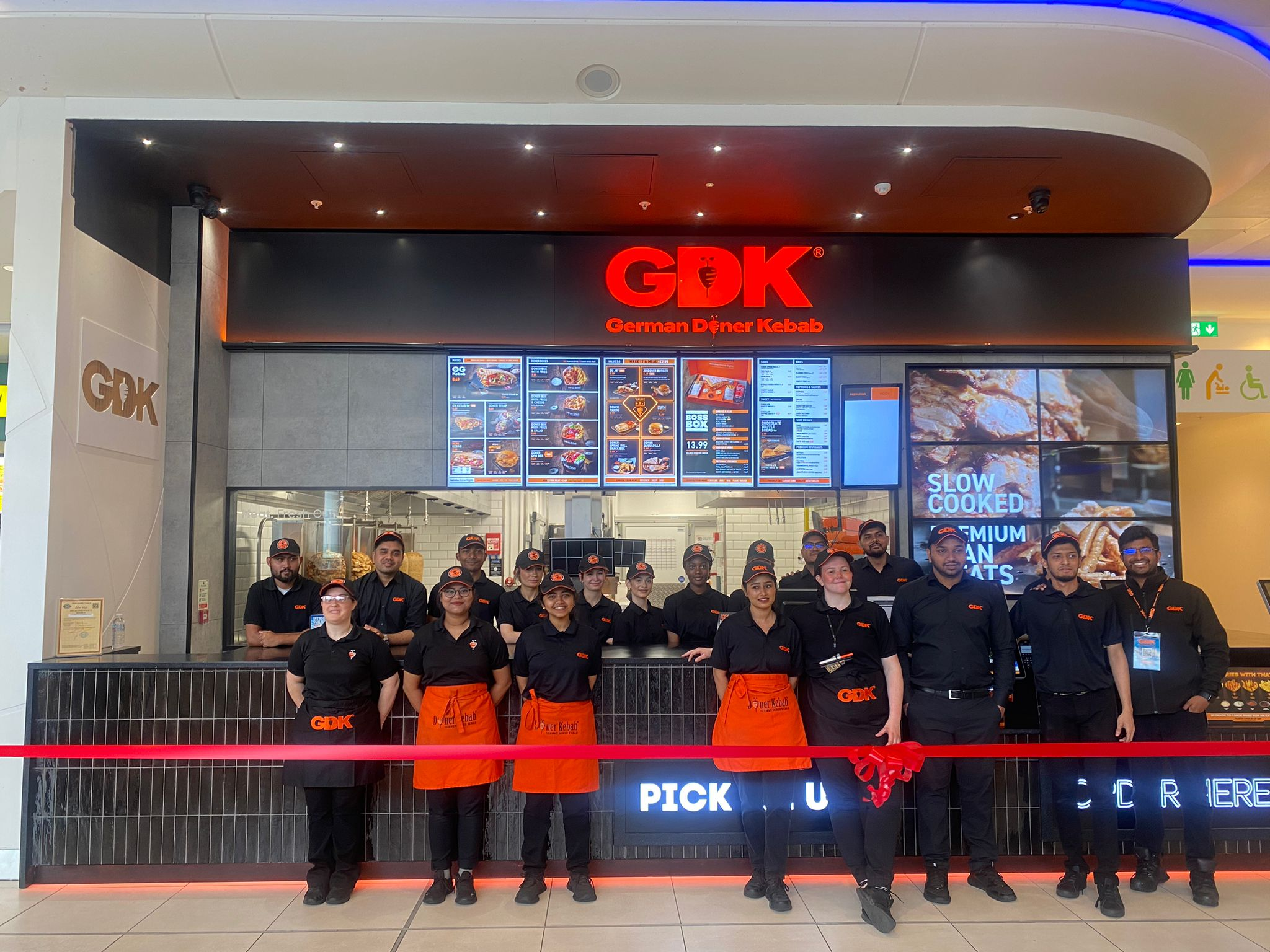
- GDK restaurant in Leeds, UK
- Industry: Fast casual kebab restaurant
- Founded: Founder Sha Alam Hussain 2013; 13 years ago Dubai, United Arab Emirates
- Headquarters: Glasgow, Scotland, United Kingdom (2017–)
- Number of locations: 170
- Area served: Canada; Saudi Arabia; Sweden; United Arab Emirates; United Kingdom; United States
- Key people: Simon Wallis (CEO); Dr Thorsk Westphal (CMO); Deon Pillay (CPO)
- Products: Kebab
- Owner: Hero Brands (2017–)
- Website: germandonerkebab.com

German Doner Kebab (GDK) is a fast casual kebab chain, specialising in German doner kebabs, owned by Hero Brands since 2017. Tracing its heritage to a restaurant in Berlin in 1989, the first site opened in Dubai by Farshad Abbaszadeh and his wife Leila Zomorrodian in 2013. The company was purchased with a majority share in 2017 by Hero Brands and moved its headquarters to Glasgow.

The company operates more than 160 restaurants throughout the United Kingdom, Sweden, North America and the Middle East.

== History and operations ==
The company is owned, with a majority share, by Hero Brands, based in Glasgow, Scotland, which also owns Hawaiian food brand Island Poké and salad restaurant Choppaluna.

As of January 2024, the chain operates in six countries; the United Kingdom, United Arab Emirates, Sweden, Canada, United States, and Saudi Arabia.

The company claims to trace its heritage to a restaurant in Berlin, Germany in 1989. It developed its offering over the following decade, until Farshad Abbaszadeh launched the first "Doner Kebab" franchise in Dubai in 2013. It then opened its first UK restaurant in 2015, expanding to seven by the end of 2017. In 2014, the franchise won the award "Best UAE Franchise Brand" at the 2014 MENAFA Excellence awards in Dubai.

In 2016, while on holiday in Dubai, Athif Sarwar, came across the franchise and was later granted development rights to the franchise in the UK. Sarwar later purchased the international rights to the brand from Farshad Abbaszadeh, CEO and Founder of German Doner Kebab.

The chain was then bought by the Sarwar Family in 2017, which moved its headquarters to Glasgow, Scotland, in the United Kingdom.

In July 2022, Imran Sayeed, chief executive, expressed his desire for the company to be made public and listed on the New York Stock Exchange in the following three to five years, as the chain sees North America as its "next growth engine".

In March 2023, Simon Wallis was appointed chief executive replacing Imran Sayeed, with Robin Caley as chief development officer.

In May 2025, Hero Brands, the owner of German Doner Kebab (GDK), secured investment from consumer-focused private equity firm True. This funding is intended to support GDK's continued expansion in the UK and internationally.

=== United Kingdom ===
GDK's first store in the United Kingdom, was opened on 6 July 2015, on Bull Street in Birmingham, England.

In May 2019, it was estimated that the chain served £1 million worth of kebabs in its restaurants in the UK every week. GDK also announced their plan to open a new restaurant every two weeks for the remainder of 2019 as part of a "relentless UK growth" plan.

In September 2019, GDK's Fulham Broadway site was classed as London's number one place to eat on Tripadvisor.

In October 2020, it had 47 restaurants, with hopes by the company to open a further 12 by the end of 2020. In December 2020, its Peterborough new restaurant marked its 50th UK restaurant.

In February 2021, the chain announced its plan to open 47 restaurants by the end of 2021 in the UK. It opened 39 new restaurants in the UK in 2021, adding to their pre-existing 52 restaurants at the start of 2021.

In February 2022, the company announced its plan to open 78 more restaurants in the UK in 2022, bringing their total to 170 restaurants in the UK. Adding 2,900 workers to their 3,500 workforce at the time in the UK.

The chain opened their 100th UK restaurant at their Covent Garden, London site on 10 May 2022.

In June 2022, Atul Pathak, former owner of the largest McDonald's franchise in the UK of 43 restaurants, announced a partnership with GDK, with 30 planned sites to be set up in the UK as part of the deal.

In January 2025, German Doner Kebab (GDK) opened its first London train station location at Victoria Station, marking its 144th UK outlet and 55th in the capital.

In March 2025, German Doner Kebab (GDK) opened its first Cambridge location at the Cambridge Services on the A14 at Junction 24.

In May 2025, German Doner Kebab (GDK) opened its first Norwich location at 43 St Stephens Street, and a new restaurant in Kent at Bluewater Shopping Centre.

=== Middle East ===
In 2016, the chain had a location in Doha, Qatar.

In 2018, the chain had 13 sites in the United Arab Emirates, with plans to expand to 55 units in 2020 announced at the time.

In April 2019, the chain signed a new franchise deal to expand in Saudi Arabia. An agreement with Ajlan Bin Ajlan Group would lead to the potential development of 100 restaurants in Saudi Arabia over ten years.

In 2021, the chain teamed with Emirati social media influencers to promote its product "Boss Box" in the UAE.

=== Sweden ===
The chain arrived in Sweden in 2014.

In July 2019, GDK announced their plains to add four more restaurants in Sweden during mid-2019, adding to their pre-existing five.

=== Ireland ===
In 2019, the chain announced plans to open a restaurant in Dublin, Ireland, with 40 total sites in Ireland planned from 2020.

As of early 2026, there are two locations in Ireland, both of them in Dublin.

=== Canada ===
GDK opened two restaurants in Canada in 2020, in Ottawa and Surrey.

In March 2021, GDK announced their ambitions to open 100 restaurants in Canada over 10 years. The company said they are seeking multi-unit franchise partners in Calgary, Montreal and more locations in Ottawa.

Its flagship location in Canada opened in Toronto on 3 August 2021.

=== United States ===
In May 2020, the company announced their plans to open 350 restaurants in the United States, with their first to be in New Jersey. As of October 2023, the company has since opened nine restaurants within the US.

GDK opened their first US restaurant at American Dream in New Jersey in October 2021.

In January 2025, German Doner Kebab (GDK) launched its first U.S. advertising campaign titled "Open Your Mouth Mind." The campaign, created by agency Quality Meats, uses quirky visuals and humor to introduce American audiences to GDK’s modern take on the traditional kebab.

== Products ==
In the UK, the chain uses beef and chicken meat imported from Germany to "maintain consistency and quality", with their waffle toasted bread also imported from Germany. The chain stated in 2015, its meat is 100% Halal. The chain's beef doner meat contains an undisclosed percentage of beef in addition to other poultry, "for added juiciness".
