= Wrap (food) =

Culinary dish made with a soft flatbread around a filling

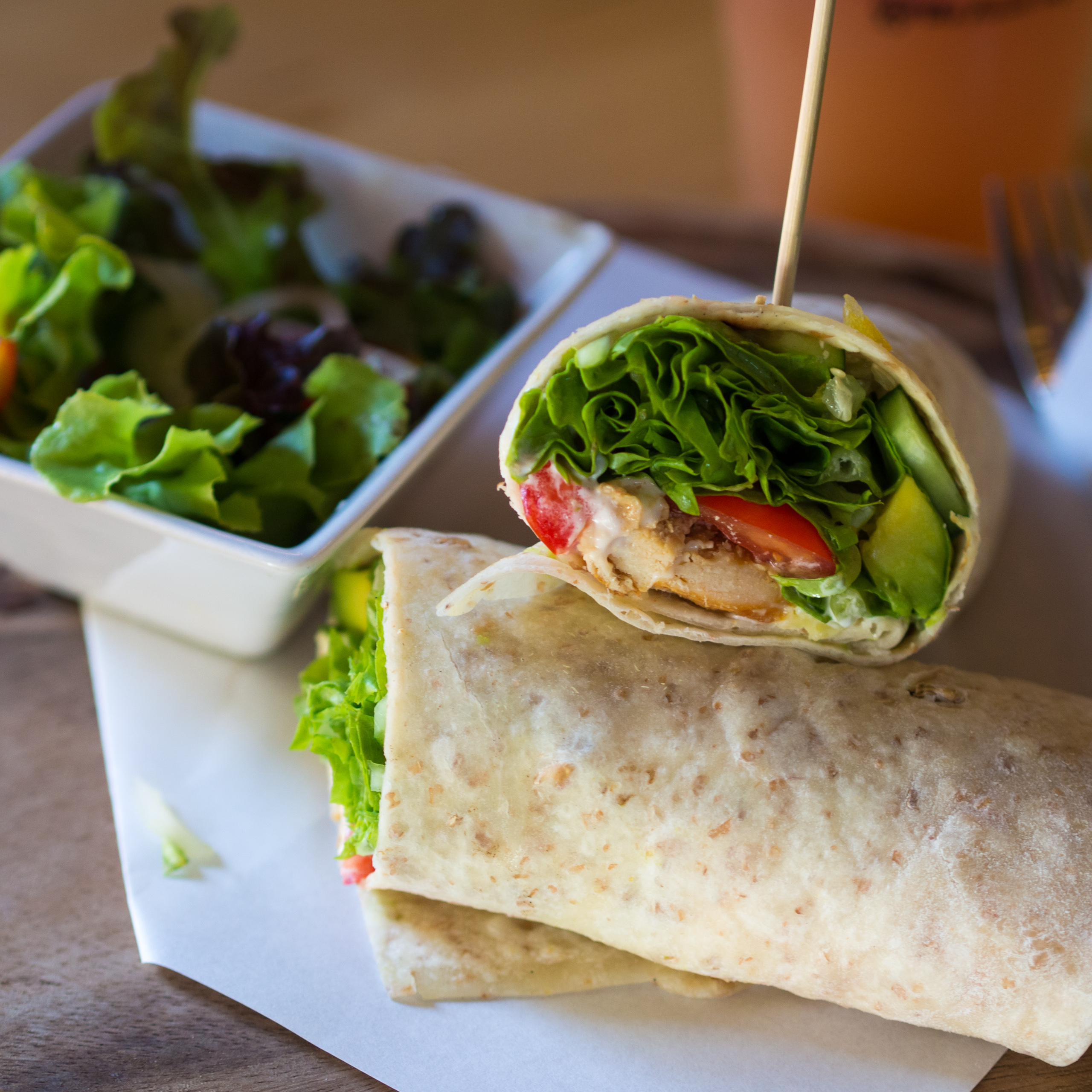
- Smoked chicken and avocado wrap
- Type: Finger food
- Main ingredients: Flatbread

A wrap is a meal made by rolling a soft flatbread around a filling.

The usual flatbreads are wheat tortillas, lavash, flat pancakes or pita; the filling may include cold sliced meat, poultry, or fish, shredded lettuce, diced tomato or pico de gallo, guacamole, sauteed mushrooms, bacon, grilled onions, cheese, and a sauce, such as ranch dressing or honey mustard.

== History ==
People in Mexico, the Mediterranean, and South Asia have been eating wraps since around the 1900s. Mexicans refer to them as burritos, and they come in different varieties, primarily wheat flour or corn, typically filled with meat, beans, rice, cheese, and other ingredients.

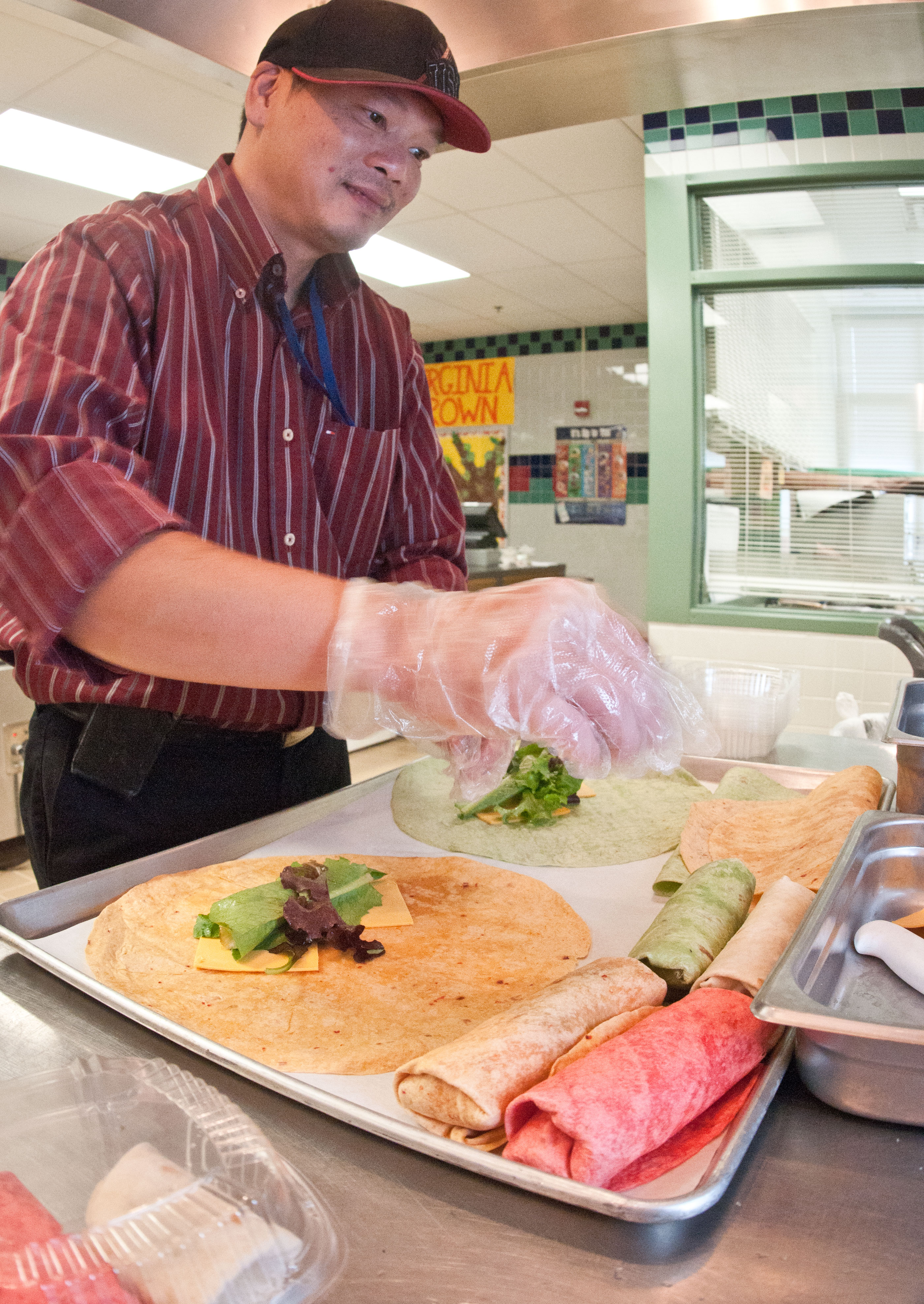
Preparing wraps in a kitchen

The wrap in its Western form probably comes from California, as a generalization of the Mexican and Tex-Mex burrito, and became popular in the 1990s. It may have been invented and named at a southern California chain called "I Love Juicy" in the early 1980s. Shortly after the Box Lunch restaurant opened in 1977 in Wellfleet Massachusetts, the "Rollwich" became their signature menu item. The OVO Bistro in NYC introduced its wrap sandwich in 1990 under the name "The King Edward," The Bobby Valentine Sports Gallery Cafe in Stamford, Connecticut, is sometimes claimed to have invented the wrap at about the same time, but Valentine is diffident about it: "Well, that's legend and folklore, but until somebody disputes me or comes up with a better story, I'll say I invented the wrap." Beth Dolan of Stamford, Connecticut, is the waitress credited for serving the first wrap after the restaurant had run out of bread. Moreover, Valentine's own story dates his use of the name 'wrap' to the mid-1990s, after it is documented in California. San Francisco-based chain World Wrapps, which opened its first location in February 1995, is credited with popularizing the wrap nationwide. In 1988, Jeff Fairhall of Seattle created the Essential Sandwich – a rice and veggie wrap – which he distributed to local health food stores. Within four years, he was making 10,000 wraps a week sold at 220 locations in Seattle.

== Wraps in public eating places ==
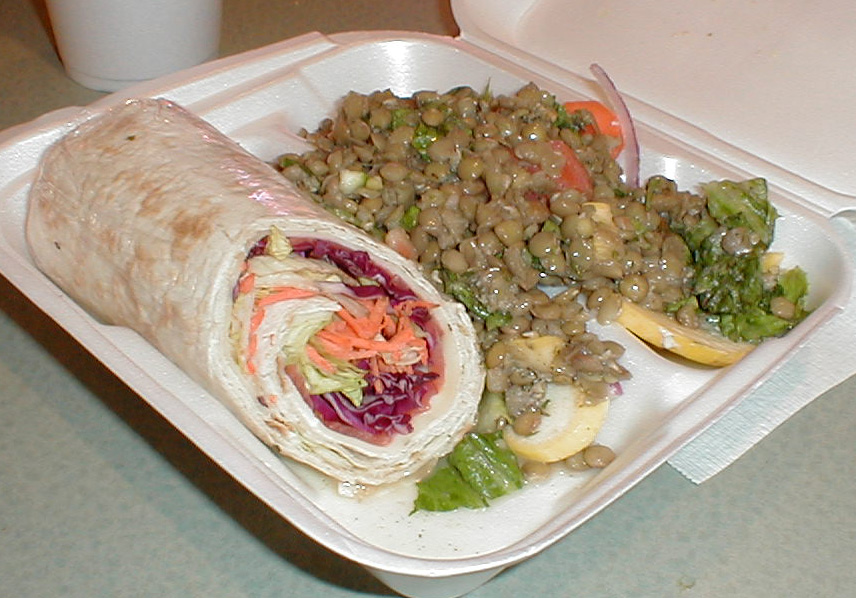
Vegetable wrap at the Hartsfield–Jackson Atlanta International Airport

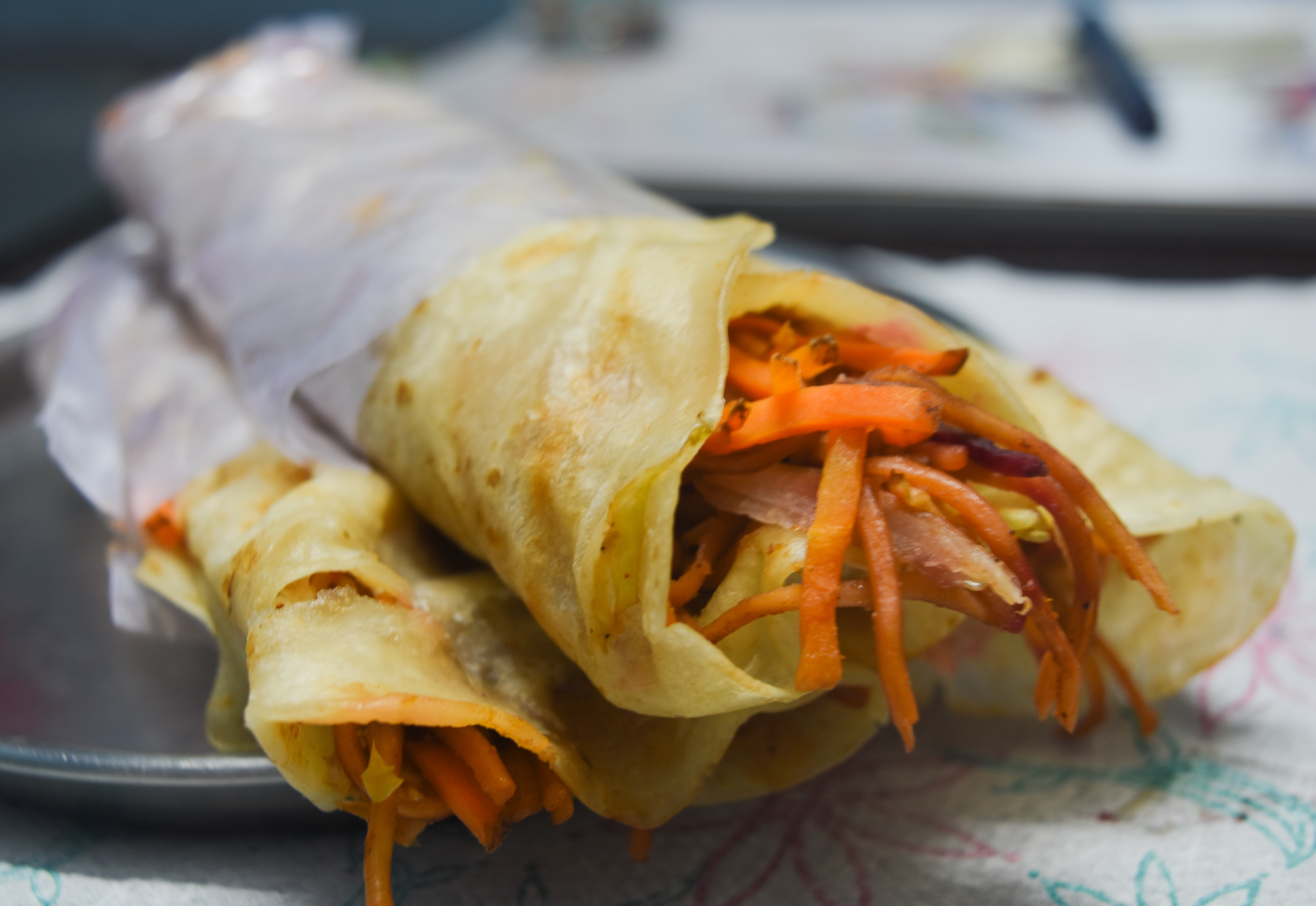
Kati roll served in Kolkata, India

In the 1900s, kati rolls became a popular street food in Kolkata, India, with kebab wrapped in paratha bread; over the years, many variants have evolved, all of which now go under the generic name of kati roll. Restaurants such as Camille's Sidewalk Cafe, Sonic Drive-In, Jason's Deli, Buffalo Wild Wings, Subway, TOGO'S, Chick-fil-A, Roly Poly, and McAlister's Deli, serve wraps. KFC now serves its chicken in a wrap as menu choice, with lettuce, mayonnaise and salsa. McDonald's had a Snack Wrap, with a fried or grilled chicken strip, lettuce, cheddar, and ranch dressing. It was discontinued but was brought back in the US on July 10th 2025 with the option of Ranch or Spicy Pepper sauce.

== See also ==
- Kati roll
- Cheese roll
- Falafel
- Doner kebab
- Gyros
- List of sandwiches
- Món cuốn
- Ssam
- Shawarma
- French tacos
- Spring roll
- Lumpia
- Dürüm
