= Shawarma =

Middle Eastern dish

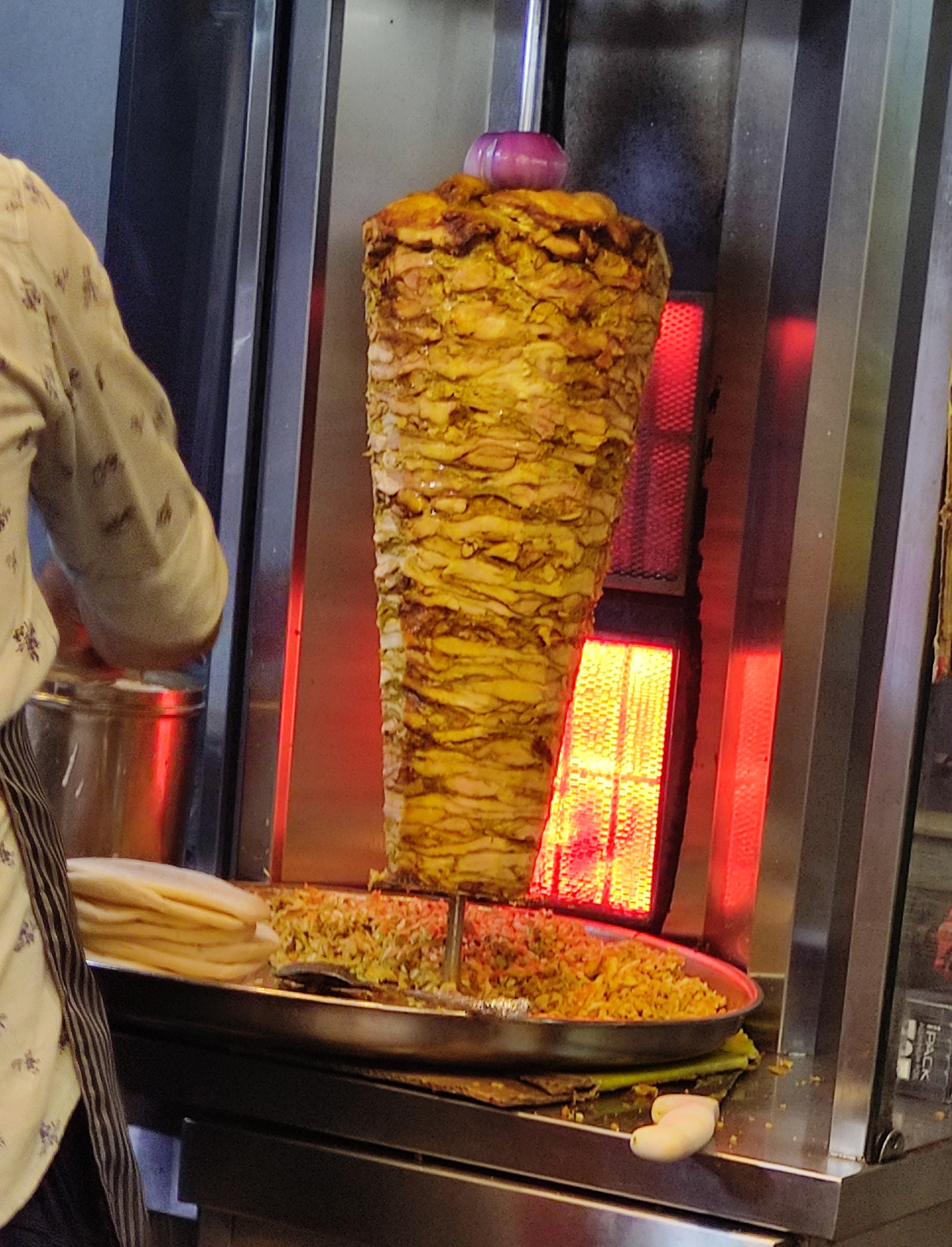
- Shawarma meat on a rotating vertical spit, next to flatbreads
- Alternative names: Showarma, shaurma, shoarma, etc.
- Type: Rotisserie
- Place of origin: Ottoman Empire, Middle East
- Region or state: Levant
- Associated cuisine: Arab cuisine
- Serving temperature: Hot
- Main ingredients: Meat (traditionally lamb or mutton, but also chicken, turkey, beef, or veal); pita, laffa, lavash, or any other suitable bread for a wrap; chopped or shredded vegetables; assorted condiments
- Similar dishes: Doner kebab, İskender kebap, gyros, al pastor

Shawarma (/ʃəˈwɑːrmə/; Arabic: شاورما) is a Middle Eastern food that originated in the Levant during the Ottoman Empire. It consists of meat cut into thin slices, stacked in an inverted cone, and roasted on a slow-turning vertical spit. Traditionally made with lamb or mutton, it may also be made with chicken, turkey meat, beef, falafel or veal. The surface of the rotisserie meat is routinely shaved off once it cooks and is ready to be served.

Shawarma is a popular street food throughout the world.

== Etymology ==
The name shāwarmā in Arabic is a rendering of the term çevirme in Turkish ([tʃeviɾˈme], lit. 'turning; hence, roughly synonymous to döner in this context'), referring to rotisserie.

The name is attested in English and Arabic as early as the 19th century; Socrates Spiro's 1895 Egyptian Arabic-English dictionary translated šāwirma (شاورمه) as "rich stew, roast meat".

== History ==
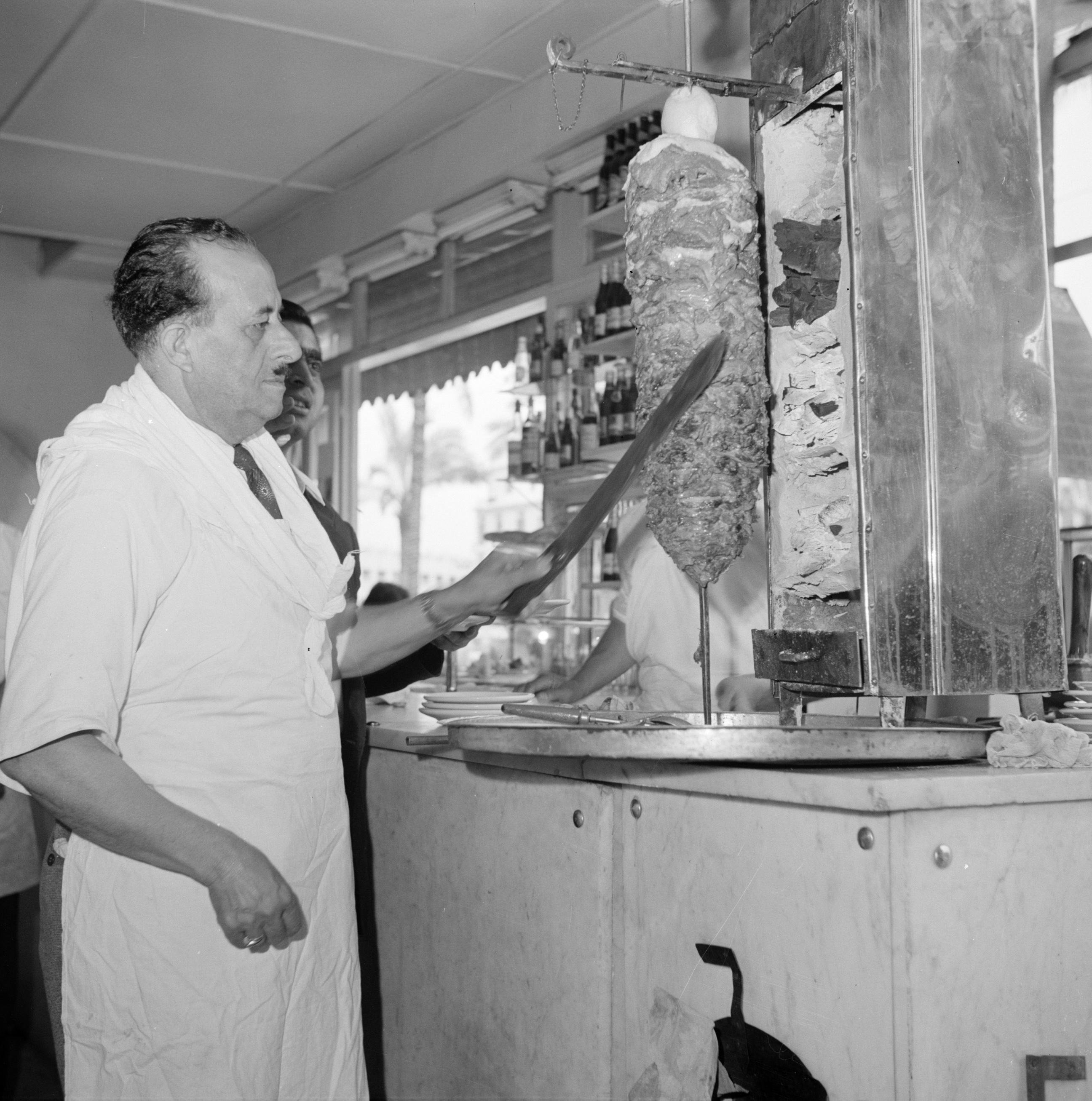
Shawarma preparation in Lebanon, 1950

The technique of shawarma—grilling a vertical stack of meat slices and cutting it off as it cooks—first appeared during the Ottoman Empire in the 19th century in the form of döner kebab, from which both the Greek gyros and the Levantine shawarma are derived. The innovation of this technique is credited by Encyclopedia Britannica to a 19th-century Turkish butcher named Iskender, whose shop in Bursa offered grilled meats that were layered on the vertical spit and slowly carved off into pieces.

Shawarma led to the development during the early 20th century of the contemporary Mexican dish tacos al pastor when it was brought there by Lebanese immigrants. The dish is also especially popular in Ottawa, Ontario, where a large community of the Lebanese diaspora exists. In 2024, Ottawa City Council declared Ottawa the "shawarma capital of Canada", following a motion introduced by Laura Dudas.

== Preparation ==
Shawarma is prepared from thin cuts of seasoned and marinated lamb, mutton, veal, beef, chicken, or turkey. The slices are stacked on a skewer about 60 cm (20 in) high. Pieces of fat may be added to the stack to provide extra juiciness and flavour. A motorized spit slowly turns the stack of meat in front of an electric or gas-fired heating element, continuously roasting the outer layer. Shavings are cut off the rotating stack for serving, customarily with a long, flat knife.

Spices may include cumin, cardamom, cinnamon, turmeric or paprika, and in some areas, baharat. Shawarma is commonly served as a sandwich or wrap, in a flatbread such as pita, shrak (saj), laffa or lavash.

Some forgo the vertical spit in favor of a more traditional horizontal spit; this allows cooking over hot coals rather than electrical heaters, similar to cağ kebabı.

== Regional varieties ==
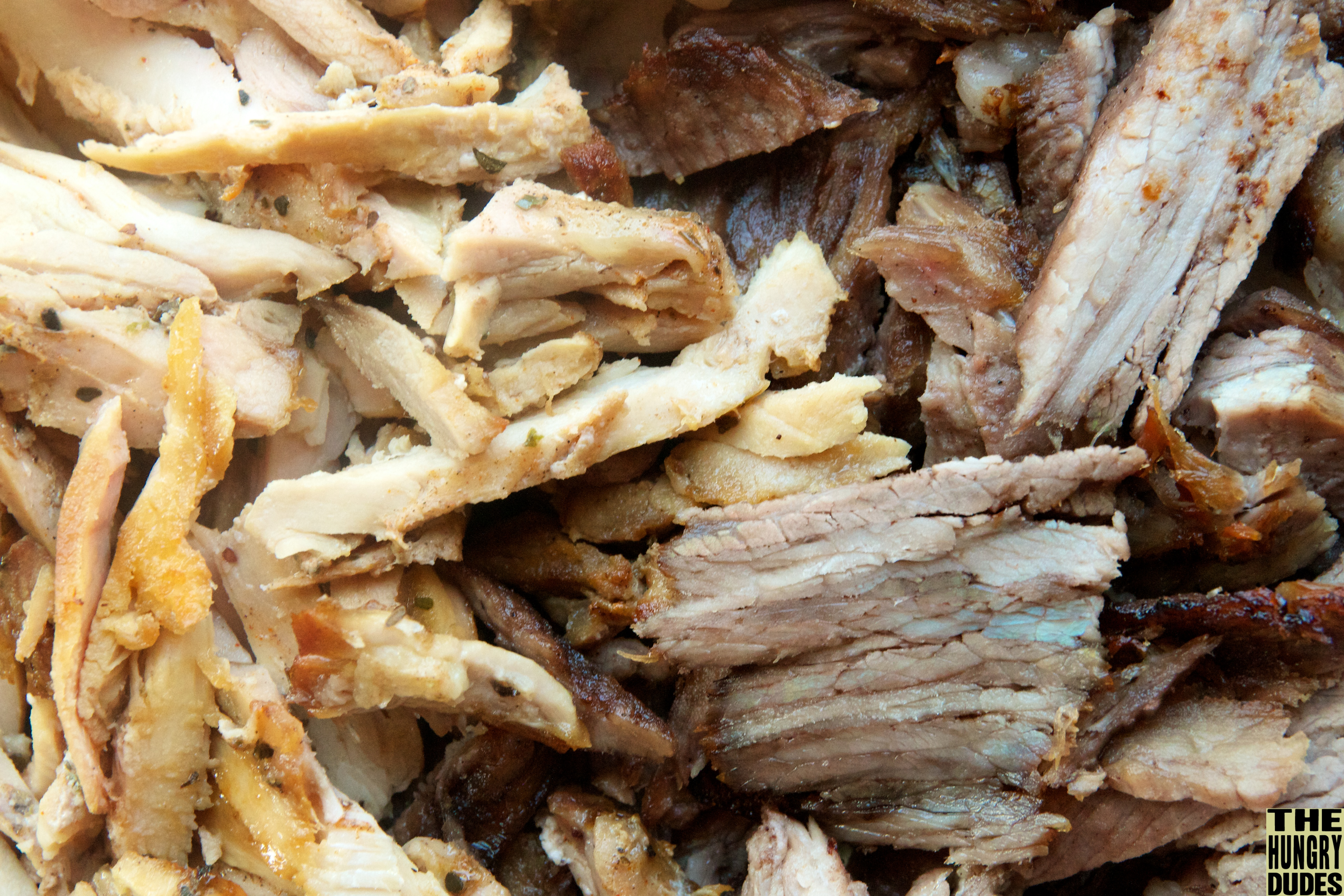
Chicken and lamb shawarma

=== Middle East ===
In the Middle East, chicken shawarma is typically served with garlic sauce, fries, and pickles. The garlic sauce served with the sandwich depends on the meat. Toum or toumie sauce is made from garlic, vegetable oil, lemon, and egg white or starch, and is usually served with chicken shawarma. Tarator sauce is made from garlic, tahini sauce, lemon, and water, and is served with beef shawarma.

Syrian-style shawarma is typically served with garlic sauce, while Egyptian-style shawarma commonly includes tahini sauce. Egyptian shawarma may also be served in eish fino, whereas Syrian shawarma is typically wrapped in Syrian pita. Syrian shawarma commonly uses chicken breast and thigh meat rather than lamb or beef, The two styles also differ in their spice blends. Both Syrian- and Egyptian-style shawarma are widely available in Egypt, where they often contrast due to the presence of Syrian refugees in Egypt.

Palestinian shawarma is typically served with sumac, onions, and tahini.

In Israel, most shawarma is made with dark-meat turkey, commonly served with tahina sauce instead of yogurt for kashrut reasons. It is often garnished with diced tomatoes, cucumbers, onions, pickled vegetables, hummus, garlic mayo, tahini sauce, sumac, or amba mango sauce. Some restaurants offer additional toppings, including grilled peppers, eggplant, or French fries.

=== Caucasus ===
In Armenia and Georgia, shawarma is traditionally made with thin cuts of marinated meat which is left marinating overnight in spices such as coriander, cumin, cardamom, paprika, garlic, lemon juice, and olive oil.

=== Africa ===
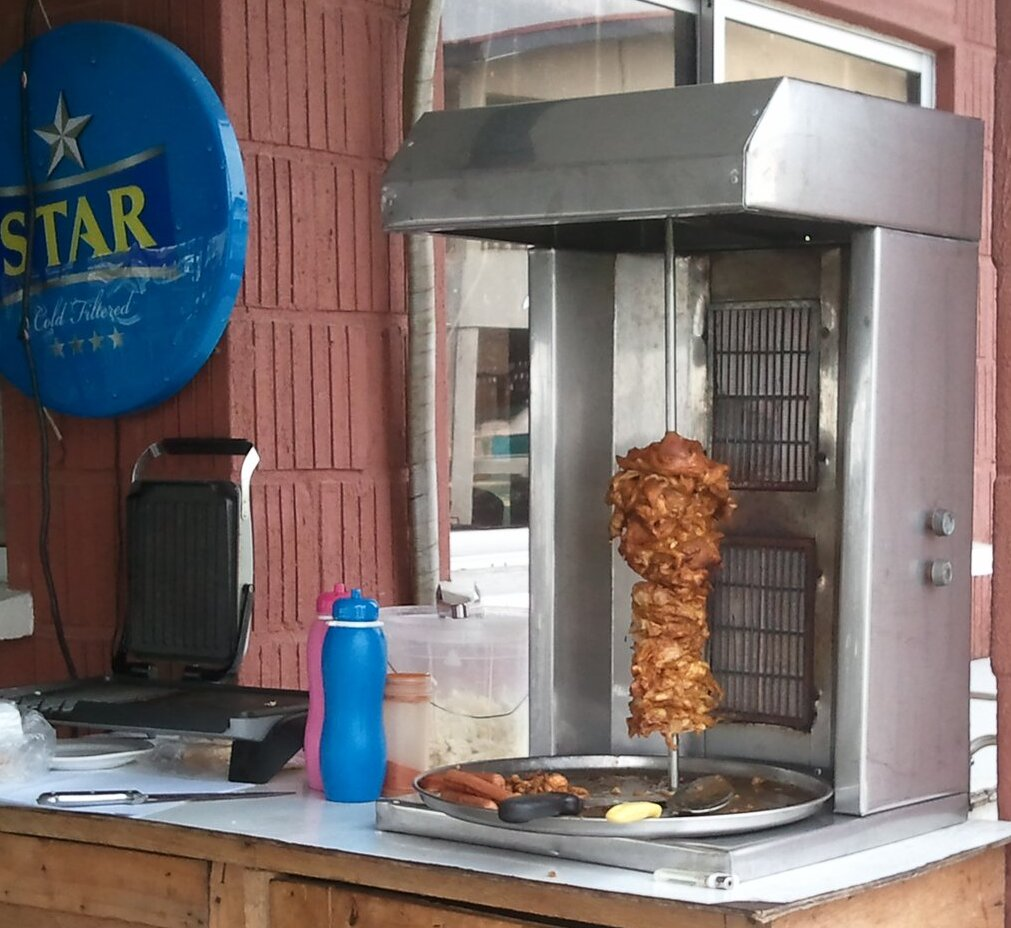
Nigerian shawarma, with hot dogs to the side

Nigerian Shawarma is a staple streetfood in Lagos. In Nigeria the vegetables are different as typically there are no tomatoes or onions in most Nigerian style shawarma but rather shredded cabbage and sometimes shredded carrots too. Nigerian shawarma uses spices like garlic, thyme, cumin, onion powder, black pepper, paprika as well as boullion cubes. Hot dog or sausage is also added to the shawarma. The sauce is a creamy blend of salad cream, mayo and ketchup with pepper powder. There are three main variants, chicken shawarma, beef shawarma and a combo version of both meat.

It is thought that shawarma was popularized in Nigeria in the 20th century by Lebanese immigrants to Nigeria.

== Culture ==
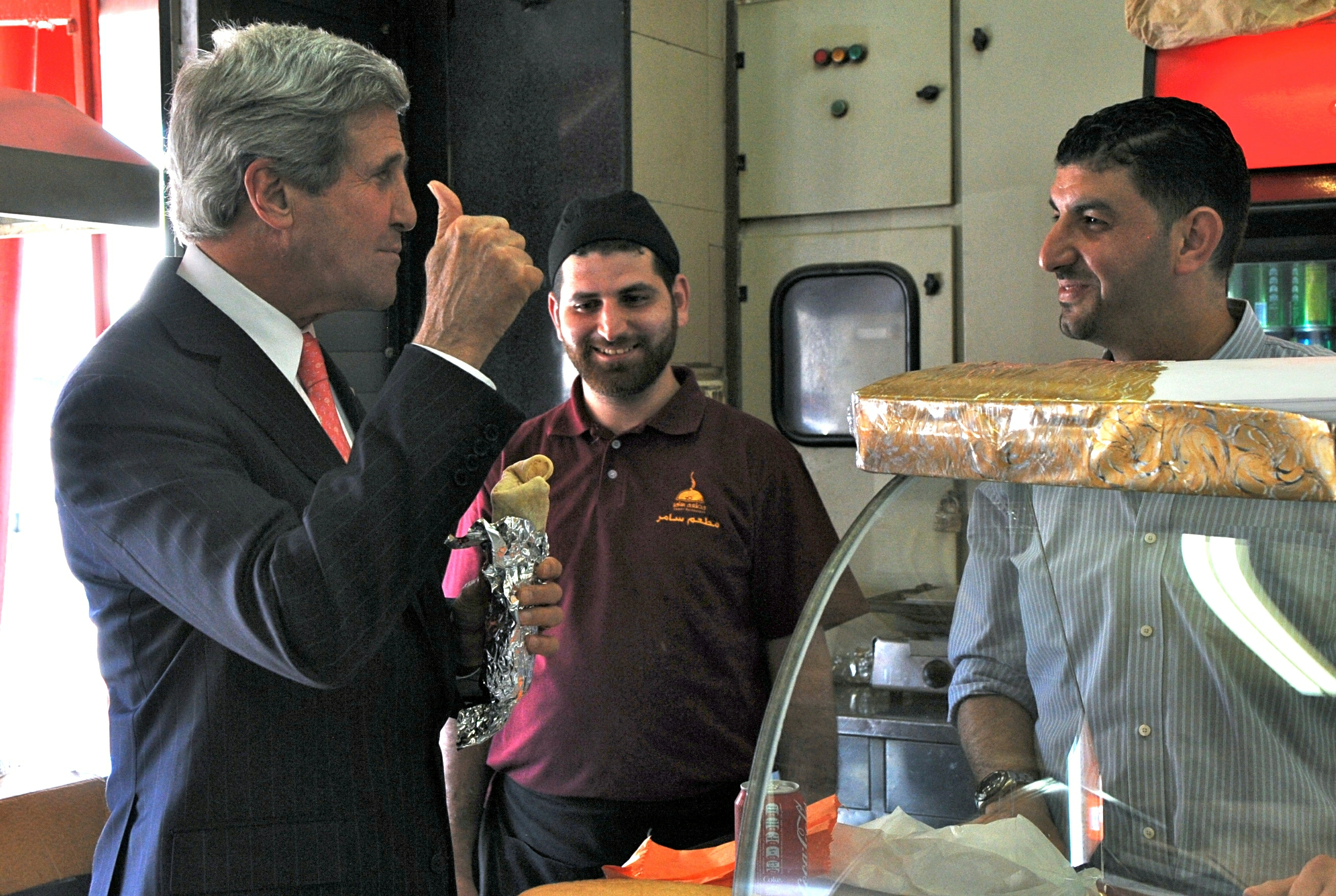
United States Secretary of State John Kerry being served a shawarma in Ramallah, 2013

Shawarma has been described as a "globalized" food due to its international ubiquity and many regional variations.

Shawarma's adaptation and popularity in Israeli cuisine has been a subject of political debate within the politics of food in the Arab–Israeli conflict.

=== World records ===
The Guinness World Record for "longest line of shawarma sandwiches" was set on June 7th 2026 in Ottawa, Canada. The line was 2,451 shawarmas long (375 meters), the previous record was 2,187 shawarmas long. 30 volunteers were involved in the assembly of the dish.

== Gallery ==
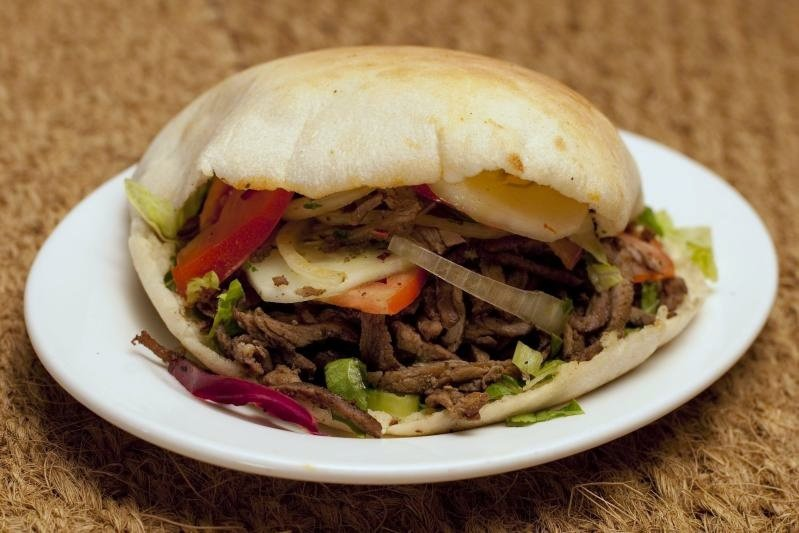
Shawarma in pita

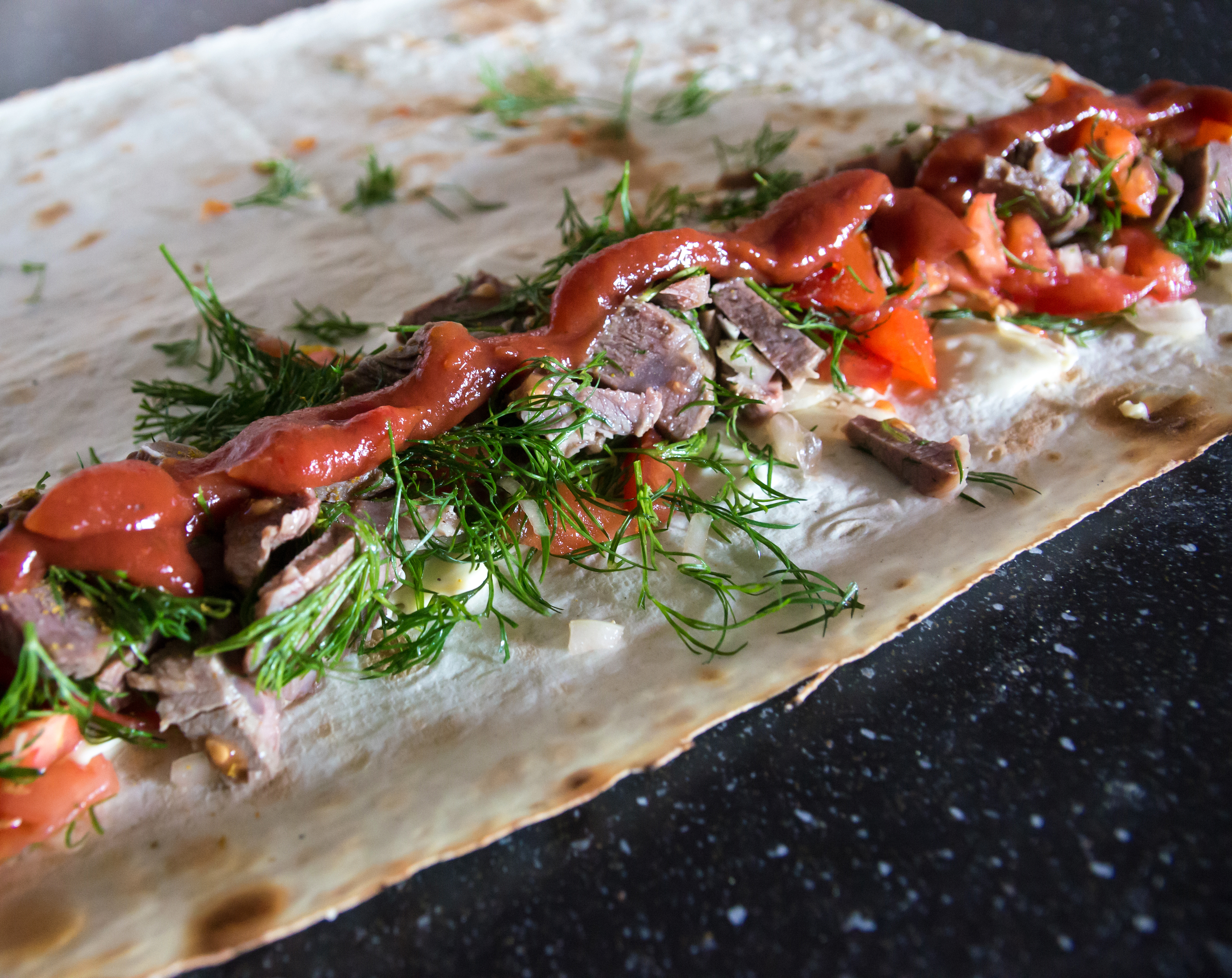
Shawarma on lavash in Russia.

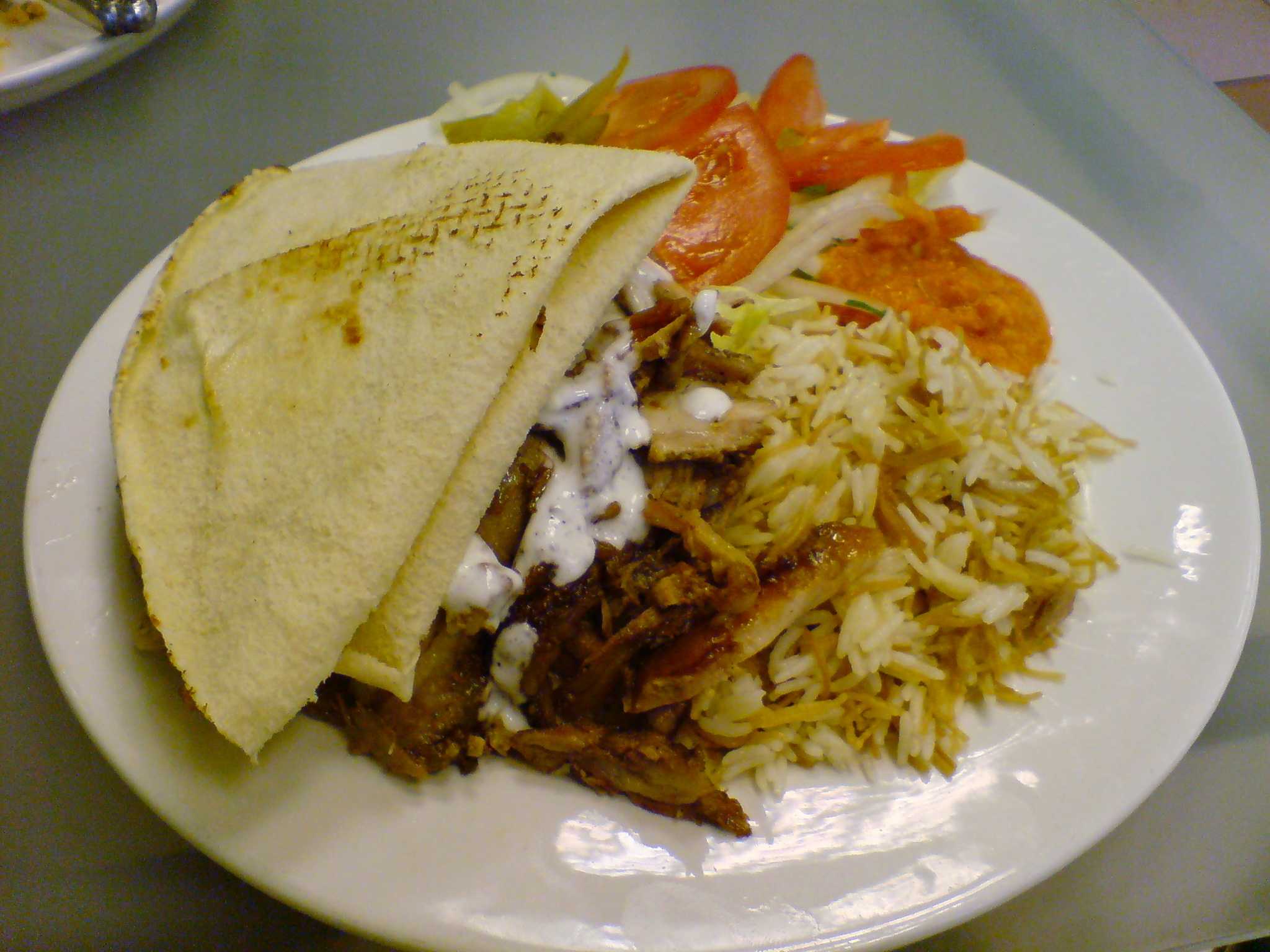
Mixed shawarma with rice and tomatoes

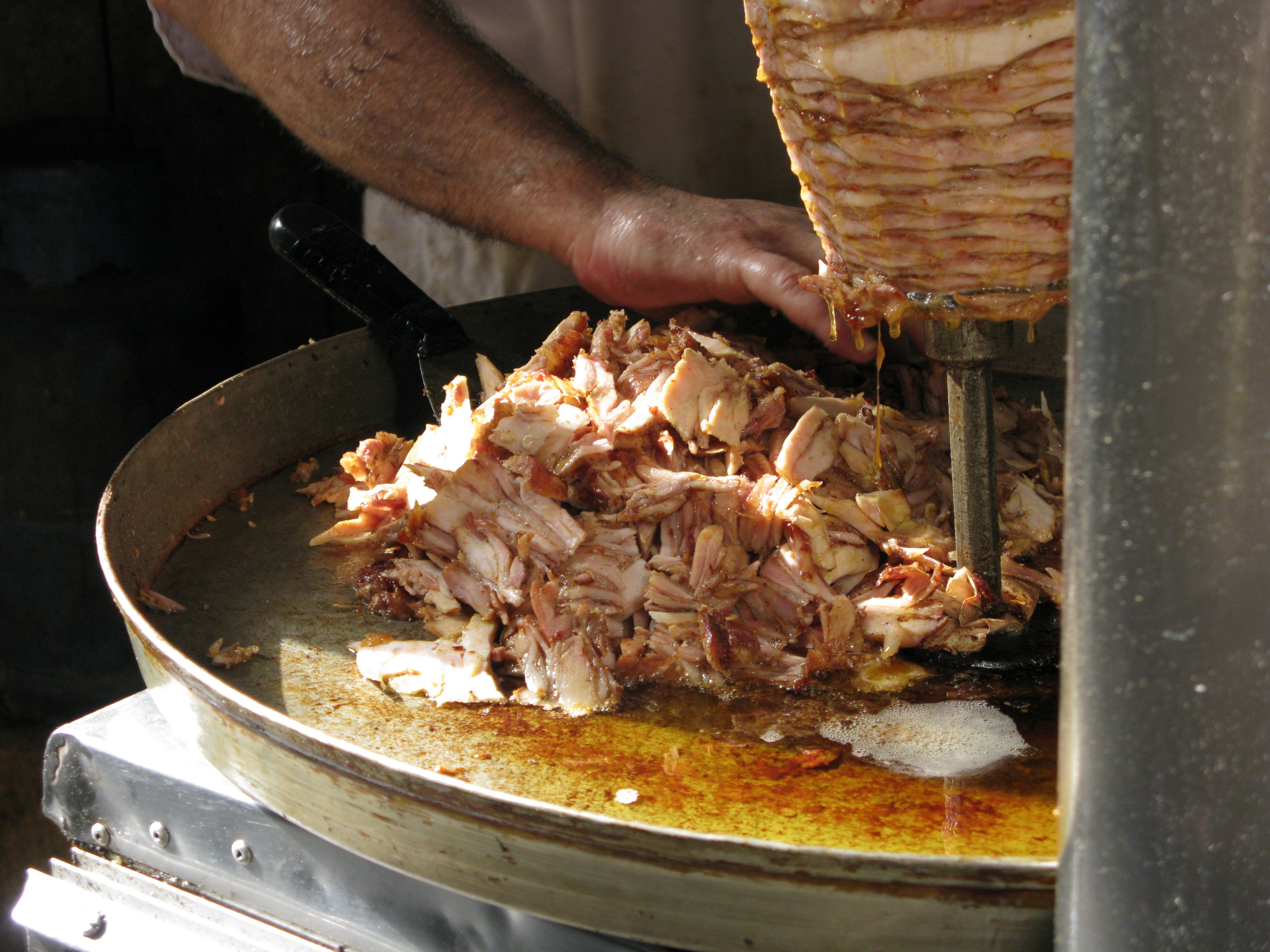
Slicing and preparation. In Aleppo, Syria.

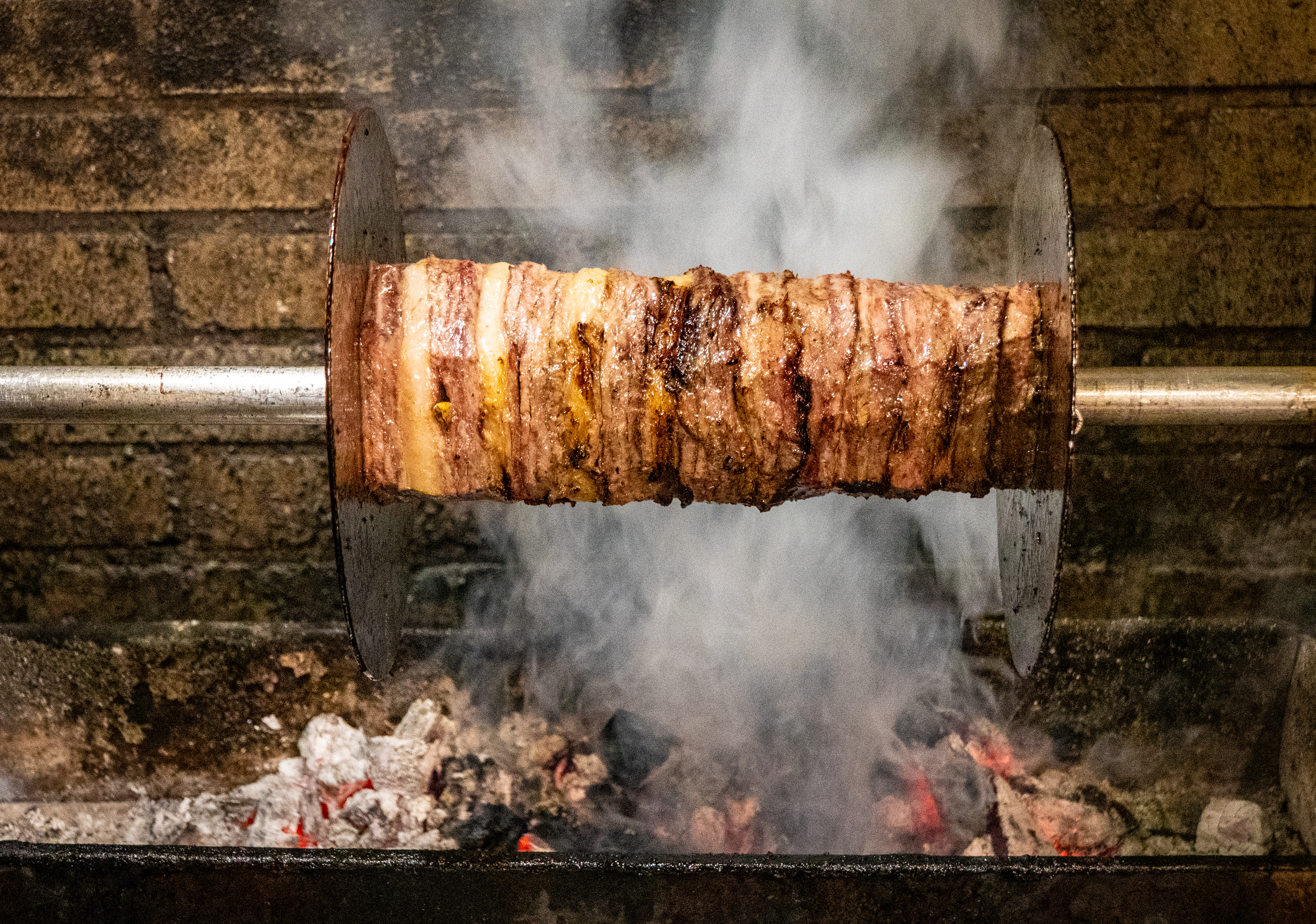
Horizontally roasted shawarma being cooked over coals

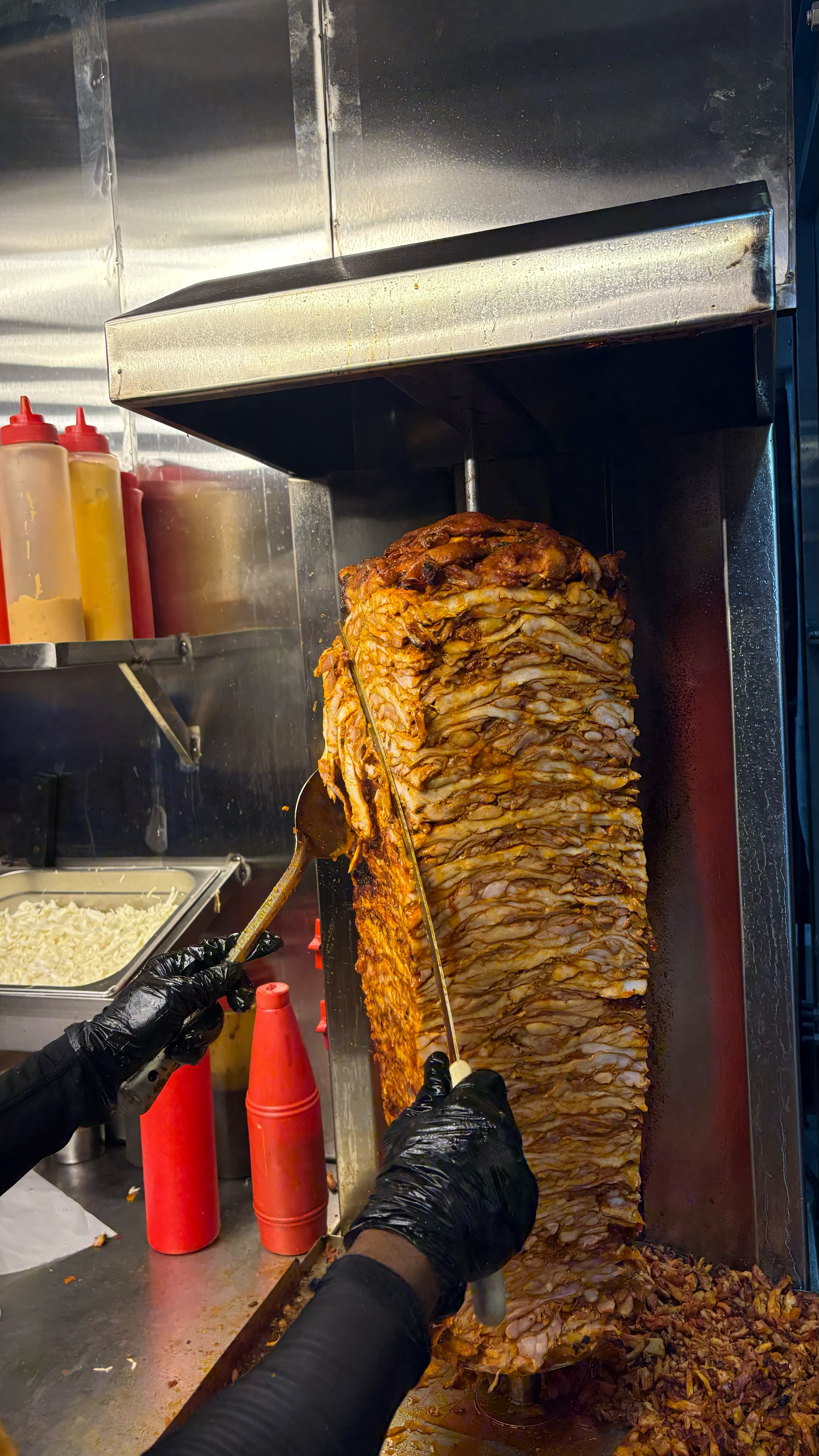
Chicken shawarma on a vertical rotisserie

== See also ==
- Al pastor
- Burrito
- Doner kebab
- Gyros
- Kati roll
