= Doner kebab =

Meat dish

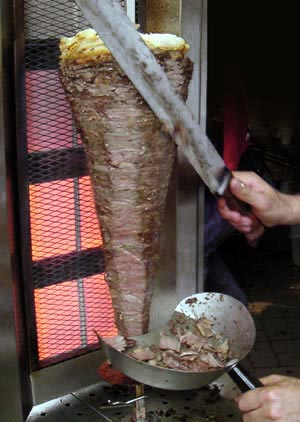
- Döner kebab
- Course: Snack or main course
- Place of origin: Ottoman Empire
- Region or state: Turkey
- Serving temperature: Hot
- Main ingredients: Lamb, beef, chicken, or (rarely) pork
- Variations: İskender, shawarma, gyros, al pastor

Doner kebab or döner kebab (Note: UK: /ˈdɒnər kɪˈbæb/ DON-ər kib-AB, US: /ˈdoʊnər kɪˈbɑːb/ DOH-nər kib-AHB; Turkish: döner or döner kebap, pronounced [dœˈnæɾ (ceˈbap)].) is a Turkish dish made of meat cooked on a vertical rotisserie. Seasoned meat stacked in the shape of an inverted cone is turned slowly on the rotisserie, next to a vertical cooking element. The operator uses a knife to slice thin shavings from the outer layer of the meat as it cooks. The vertical rotisserie was invented in the 19th-century Ottoman Empire, and dishes such as the Arab shawarma, Greek gyros, Greek-Canadian donair, and Mexican al pastor are derived from the rotisserie technique of this dish.

The modern sandwich variant of doner kebab originated and was popularized in 1970s West Berlin by Turkish immigrants. This was recognised by the Berlin-based Association of Turkish Döner Manufacturers in Europe in 2011.

The sliced meat of a doner kebab may be served on a plate with various accompaniments, stuffed into a pita or other type of bread as a sandwich, or wrapped in a thin flatbread such as lavash or filo, known as a dürüm (literally meaning roll or wrap in Turkish). Kadir Nurman in the early 1970s introduced the sandwich or wrap form, which has become popular around the world as a fast food dish sold by kebab shops, and is often called simply a "kebab". The sandwich generally contains salad or vegetables, which may include tomato, lettuce, cabbage, onion with sumac, fresh or pickled cucumber or chili, and various types of sauces.

== History ==
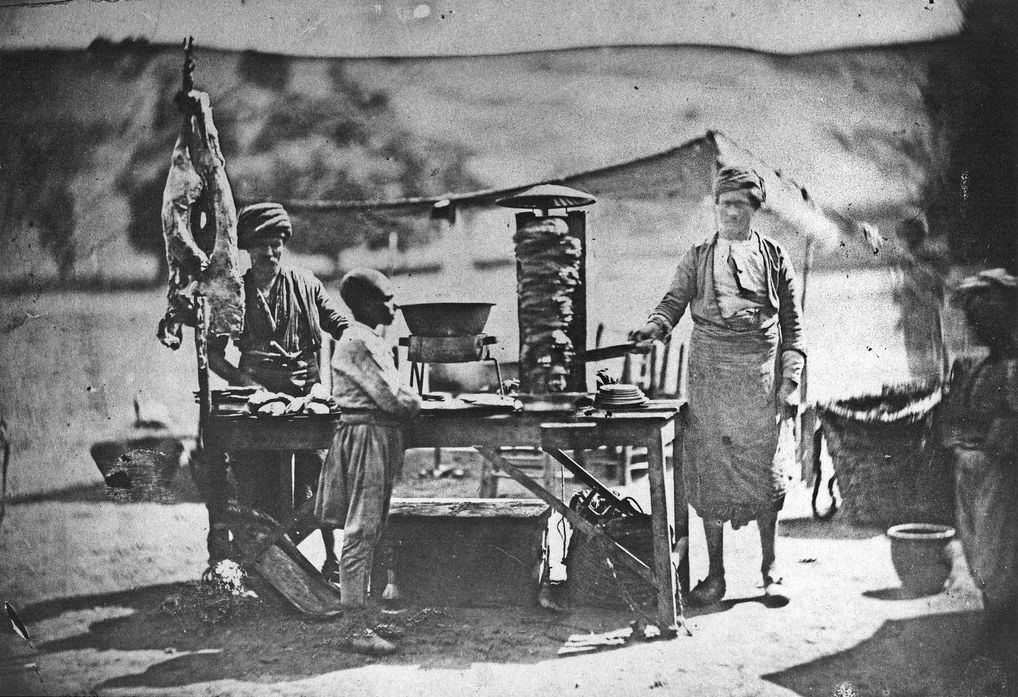
The earliest known photo of döner, by James Robertson, 1855, Ottoman Empire

In the Ottoman Empire, at least as far back as the 17th century, stacks of seasoned sliced meat were cooked on a horizontal rotisserie, similar to the cağ kebab. The vertical rotisserie was introduced no later than the mid-19th century. The town of Bursa, in modern-day Turkey, is often considered the birthplace of the vertically roasted doner kebab. According to Yavuz İskenderoğlu, his grandfather İskender Efendi as a child in 1850s Bursa had the idea of roasting the lamb at his father's restaurant vertically rather than horizontally. It was a success, and some years later became known as doner kebap. However, he may have been preceded by Hamdi Usta from Kastamonu around 1830.

A version popular in the Arab world became known as shawarma. By at least the 1930s, it had been brought overseas, and was sold in restaurants in Mexico by Lebanese immigrants. The Greek variation was likely brought to Greece proper by Greek refugees in the 1920s, due to the population exchange between Greece and Turkey, later transforming into gyros.

It was not until a century after its invention that doner kebab was introduced and popularized in Istanbul, most famously by Beyti Güler. His restaurant, first opened in 1945, was soon discovered by journalists and began serving doner and other kebab dishes to kings, prime ministers, film stars and celebrities. It has been sold in sandwich form in Istanbul since at least the mid-1960s.

The doner kebab and its derivatives served in a sandwich form as "fast food" came to worldwide prominence in the mid- to late 20th century. The first doner kebab shop in London opened in 1966 and such shops were a familiar sight in provincial cities by the late 1970s. Gyros was already popular in Greece and New York City in 1971. A Greek-Canadian variation, the donair, was introduced in 1972, eventually becoming the official food of Halifax, and spreading across the country. By the 1960s, the taco al pastor in Mexico had evolved from the shawarma.

In Germany, the doner kebab was popularized by Turkish guest workers in Berlin in the early 1970s. The dish developed there from its original form into a distinctive style of sandwich with abundant salad, vegetables, and sauces, sold in large portions at affordable prices. It would soon become one of the top-selling fast food and street food dishes in Germany and much of Europe, and popular around the world.

== Etymology ==
In the English name "doner kebab" is borrowed from the Turkish words döner + kebap, with the Turkish letter ö usually anglicized as "o", though "döner kebab" is an alternative spelling in English. The word kebab is used, which comes to English from the Arabic: كَبَاب (kabāb), partly through Urdu, Persian and Turkish; it may refer to a number of different kebab dishes made with roasted or grilled meat. Although kebab has been used in English since the late 17th century, doner/döner kebab is known only from the mid-20th century or later. The Turkish word döner comes from dönmek ('to turn, to rotate'), so the Turkish name döner kebap literally means 'rotating roast'. In German, it is spelled Döner Kebab; the sandwich is often called ein Döner. Particularly in British English, a doner kebab sandwich may be referred to simply as "a kebab". A Canadian variation is donair. In Greek, it was originally called döner (Greek: ντονέρ) but later came to be known as gyros, from γύρος ('turn'), a calque of the Turkish name. The Arabic name شاورما (shāwarmā) derives from another Turkish word, çevirme, also meaning 'turning'. Persians refer to it as kebab torki.

== Doner in Turkey ==
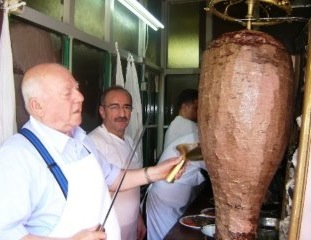
Döner seller at work in Bursa

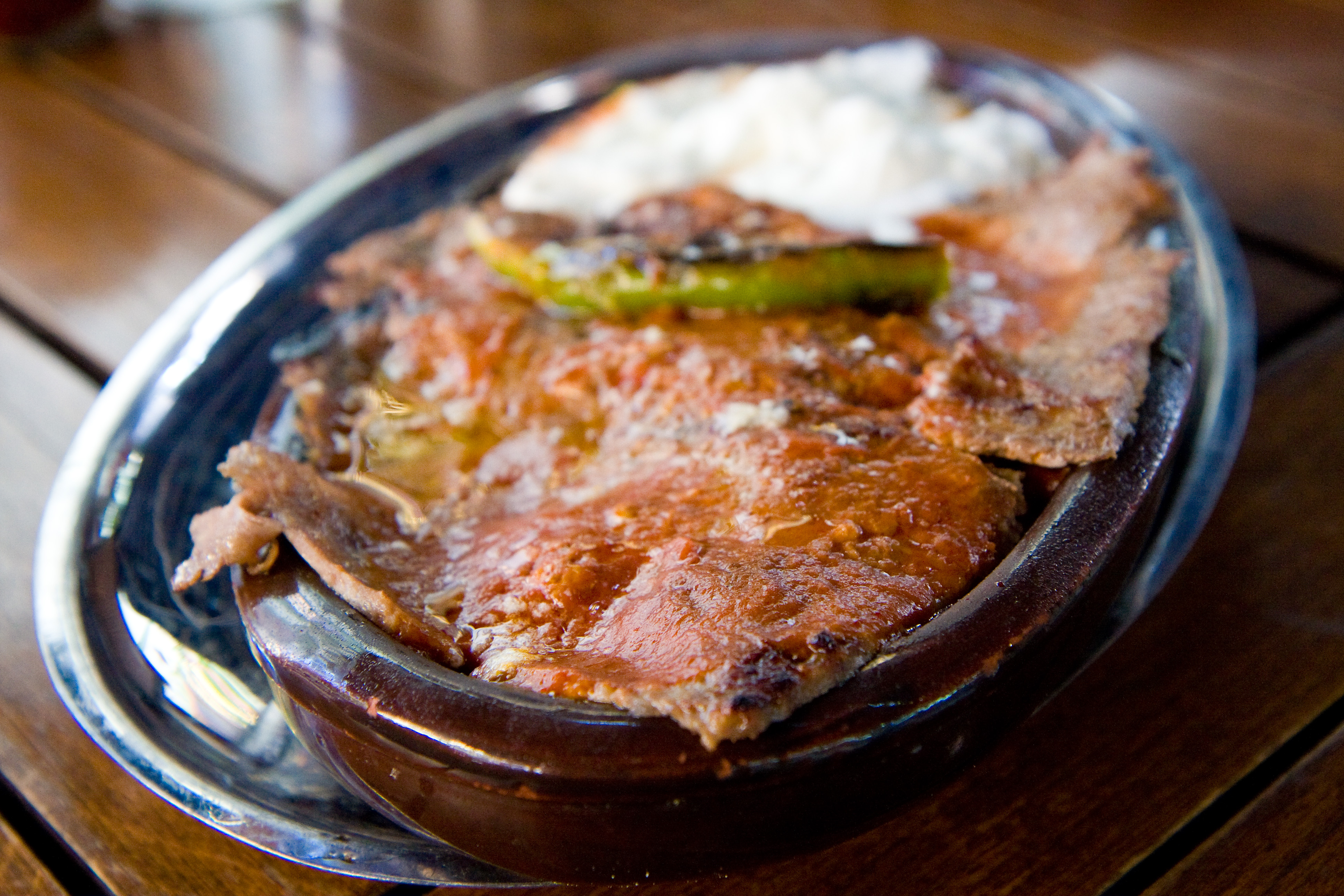
İskender or "Bursa kebabı"

There are many variations of doner in Turkey:

- Porsiyon ('portion', doner on a slightly heated plate, sometimes with a few grilled peppers or broiled tomatoes on the side)
- Pilavüstü ('over rice', doner served on a base of pilaf rice)
- İskender (specialty of Bursa, served in an oblong plate, atop a base of pide (thin flatbread similar to pita), with a dash of pepper or tomato sauce and boiling fresh butter). "Kebapçı İskender" is trademarked by Yavuz İskenderoğlu, whose family still runs the restaurant in Bursa. İskender is commonly served with yoghurt on the plate.
- Dürüm, wrapped in a thin lavaş that is sometimes also grilled after being rolled, to make it crispier. It has two main variants in mainland Turkey:
  - Soslu dürüm or SSK (sos, soğan, kaşar; 'sauce, onion, cheese') (specialty of Ankara, contains İskender kebap sauce, making it juicier)
  - Kaşarlı dürüm döner (speciality of Istanbul, grated kaşar cheese is put in the wrap which is then toasted to melt the cheese and crisp up the lavaş)
- Tombik or gobit (literally 'the chubby', doner in a bun-shaped pita, with crispy crust and soft inside and generally less meat than a dürüm)
- Ekmekarası ('between bread', generally the most filling version, consisting of a whole (or a half) regular Turkish bread filled with doner)

== Regional variations ==
=== Europe ===
In 2022, Turkey applied for döner to be granted EU traditional speciality guaranteed status, which protects the recipe rather than its geographic origin. Beef would be required to come from cattle that is at least 16 months old, be marinated with specific amounts of animal fat, yogurt or milk, onion, salt, and thyme, as well as black, red and white peppers, and sliced off the vertical spit into pieces that are 3 to 5 millimeters thick. The German Federal Ministry of Agriculture, Food and Regional Identity objected to the application since proposals differ from typical German preparations, and vegetables, turkey, and some veal kebabs would apparently no longer be allowed.

==== Germany ====
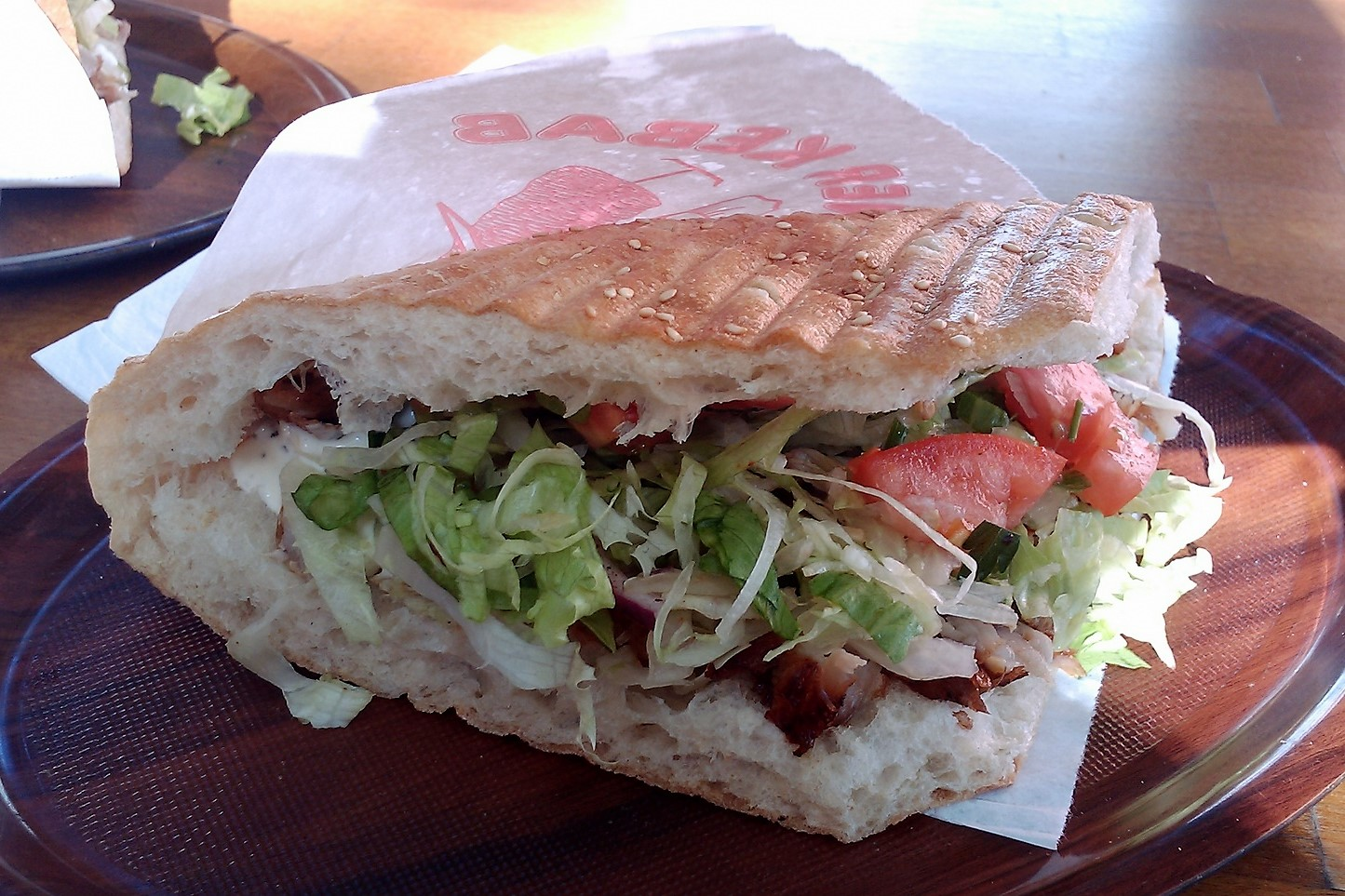
Döner, in Germany

In West Germany, gyros made with pork had been established as a fast food before döner kebab became popular, dominating the German street food market alongside Italian pizza during the 1970s.

The earliest claim to the introduction of doner kebab from Turkey dates to 1969, when Bursa native Nevzat Salim and his father started to sell Iskender Kebap in Reutlingen. However, the Association of Turkish Döner Producers in Europe (ATDID) connects the wide popularization of the dish to the stand of Turkish guest worker Kadir Nurman at West Berlin's Zoo Station in 1972, which helped establish the doner kebab sandwich as a fast food option. Although the claims of multiple persons to have "invented" the doner may be hard to prove, the further development of modern doner sandwich is connected to the city of Berlin.

The doner kebap as it was first served in Berlin contained only meat, onions and a bit of salad. Over time, it developed into a dish with abundant salad, vegetables, and a selection of sauces to choose from. Even orders placed in the Turkish language in Berlin will ask for the hot sauce using the German word scharf, flagging the hybrid nature of the Berlin style of doner kebap. This variation served with pita bread has influenced the style of doner kebap in Germany and in other nations. A 2007 survey showed that many people consider the doner kebab to be the most characteristic food of Berlin.

Annual sales of doner kebabs in Germany amounted to €2.5 billion in 2010. Beef or veal, and chicken, are widely used instead of the more expensive lamb. Turkey (Truthahn) and vegetarian versions have become increasingly popular. Common variations include the Döner-Teller, ("doner plate") in which the ingredients are served loose on a plate rather than as a sandwich, and the Döner-Box, in which they are served in a box layered on top of French fries.

Tarkan Taşyumruk, president of the Association of Turkish Döner Producers in Europe (ATDID), provided information in 2010 that, every day, more than 400 tonnes of doner kebab meat is produced in Germany by around 350 firms. At the same ATDID fair, Taşyumruk stated: "Annual sales in Germany amount to €2.5 billion. That shows we are one of the biggest fast-foods in Germany." In many cities throughout Germany, doner kebabs are at least as popular as hamburgers or sausages, especially with young people.

In 2011 there were over 16,000 establishments selling doner kebabs in Germany, with yearly sales of €3.5 billion.

==== Austria ====
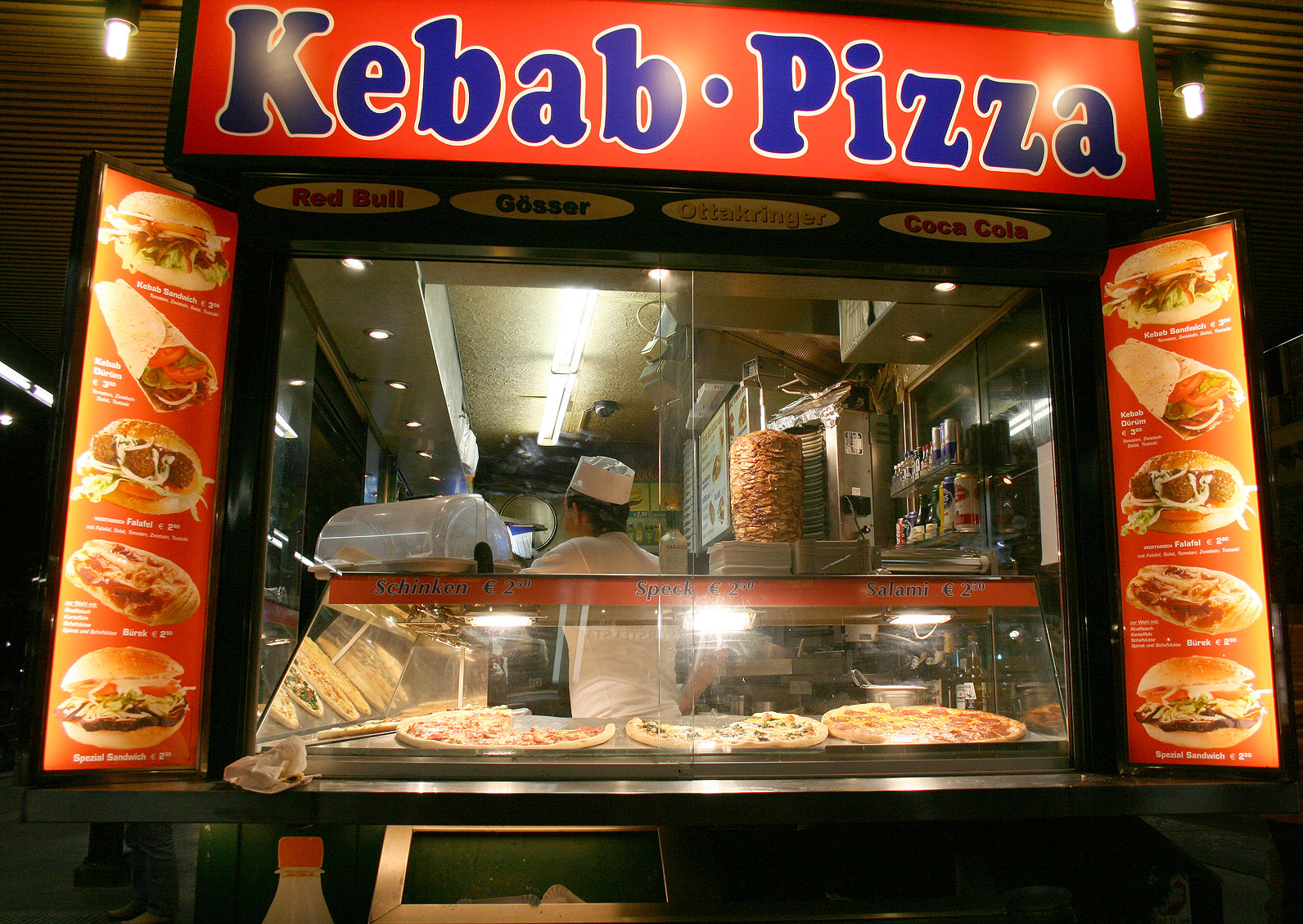
A kebab stand in Vienna, Austria

Doner kebab shops can be found in all cities across Austria. Kebabs (often referred to as "Döner") outsell burgers or the traditional Würstel (sausage).

==== Belgium ====
In Belgium, the first doner kebabs were already served in the 1970s, brought by immigrants to the country. In the mining region, mainly beef or variants with pieces of chicken was used for the doner kebab. Doner kebabs with mutton and lamb were more likely to be found in other regions of Belgium.

==== Finland ====
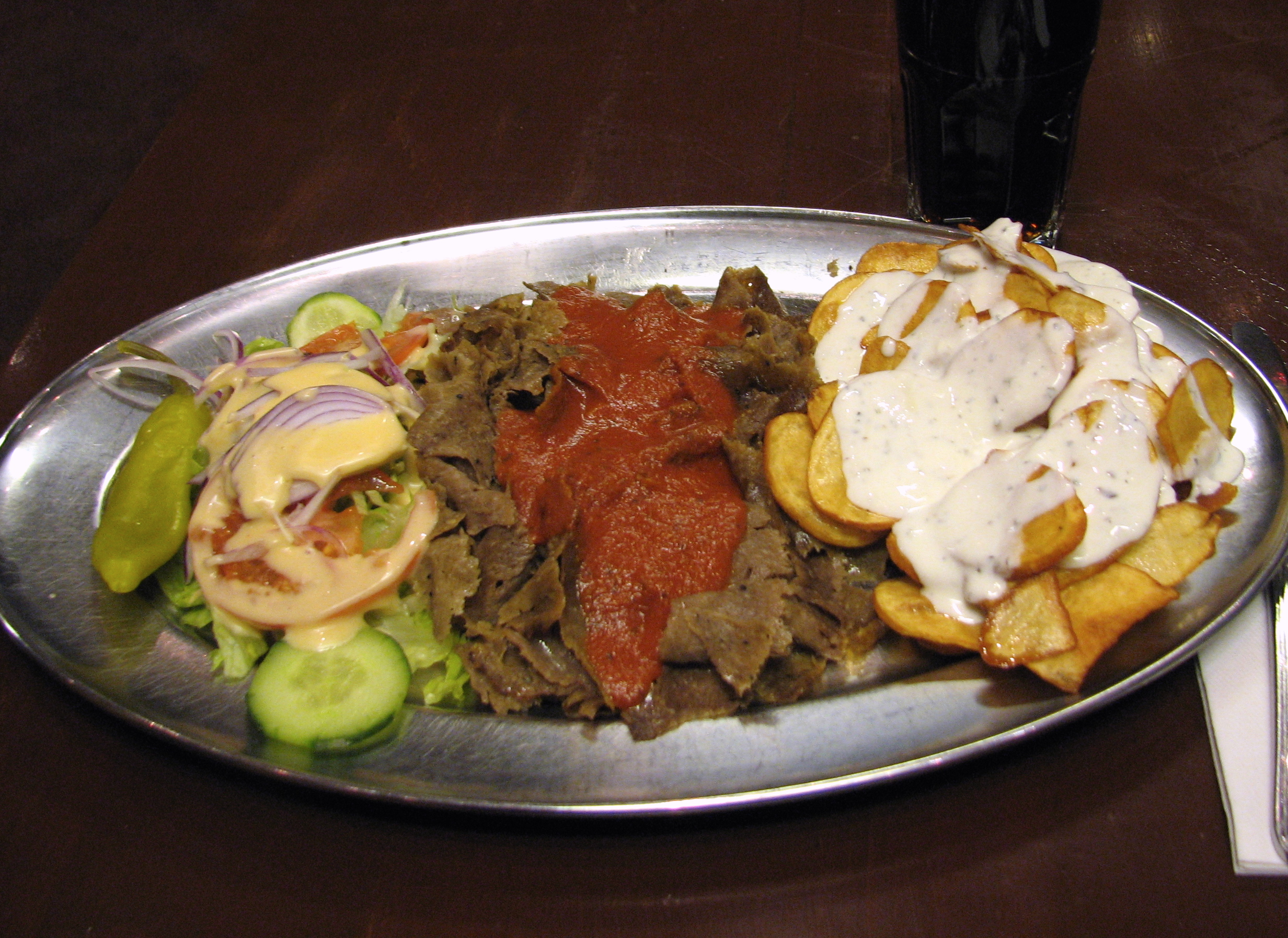
A plate of döner kebab in Kamppi, Helsinki

In Finland, doner kebabs gained popularity after the 90s, when Turkish and other Middle-Eastern immigrants started to arrive in the country in considerable numbers, opening restaurants and importing their traditional dishes. Kebabs are generally seen as fast food, often served by late-night pizzerias.

==== France ====
In Paris, France, Greek restaurateurs paved the road for doner kebabs. They were selling "sandwich grec" ("Greek sandwich"). As the Turkish community grew in size, this term was later gradually replaced by "kebab" or "sandwich turc" ("Turkish sandwich"). However, the original term sandwich grec ("Greek sandwich") is still sometimes used in Paris.

The dish became especially popular with the country's large North African population, in the 1980s. A typical kebab consists of bread stuffed with doner meat shavings, lettuce, sliced tomato and onions, with a choice of sauce including sauce blanche, a mayonnaise-yogurt sauce. Kebabs are usually served with french fries, often stuffed into the bread itself. In Paris, this variation is called sandwich grec ("Greek sandwich"). Doner kebab is the third most popular fast food in France, next to hamburgers and pizza, with more than 10,000 kebab shops selling about 300 million a year.

==== Netherlands ====
Kapsalon is a Dutch food item consisting of French fries topped with doner or shawarma meat, garlic sauce, and a layer of gouda cheese, baked or broiled until melted, and then subsequently covered with a layer of dressed salad greens and more sauce. The dish is usually served as fast food in a disposable metal tray. The term kapsalon means "hairdressing salon" or "barbershop" in Dutch, alluding to hairdresser Nathaniel Gomes who originated the dish when he requested his local kebab shop in Rotterdam to prepare it for him.

==== United Kingdom ====
The doner kebab with salad and sauce is a very popular dish in the United Kingdom, especially after a night out. The meat is sometimes sold on its own, but more commonly with chips (fries), in naan bread or in pita bread. German Doner Kebab is a Glasgow-based chain operating 100 restaurants in the UK, which specialises in the dish.

=== Americas ===
==== Canada ====
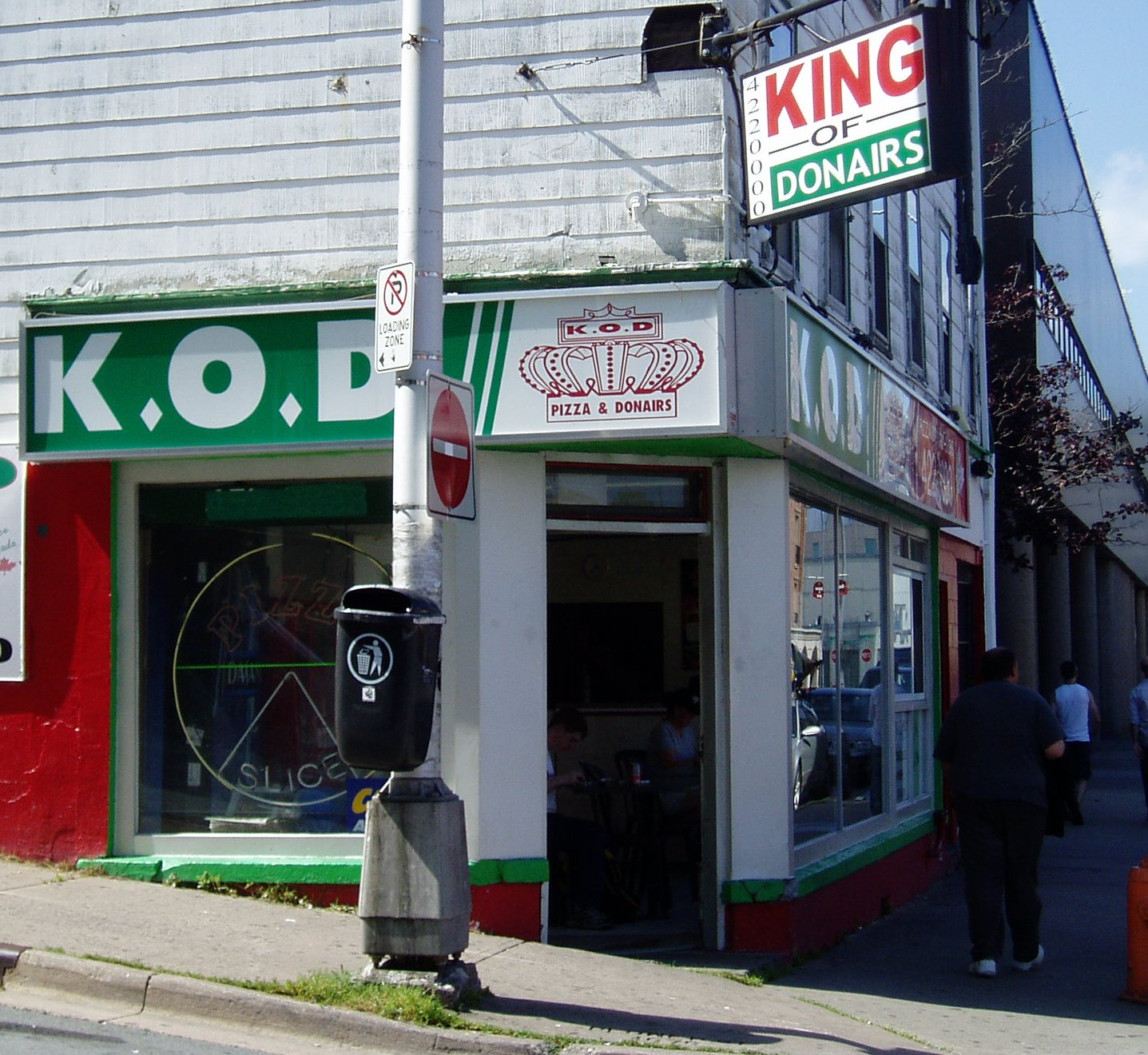
A King of Donair outlet in Halifax at Pizza Corner

A variation known as donair was introduced in Halifax, Nova Scotia, in the early 1970s. There are competing claims about the origin, but according to Halifax resident Leo Gamoulakos, his father, Greek immigrant Peter Gamoulakos, started selling Greek-style gyros at Velos Pizza in the Halifax suburb of Bedford. It did not catch on with the public, so in 1972 he modified the customary pork and lamb recipe by using spiced ground beef, Lebanese flatbread, and inventing the distinctive sweet donair sauce made with condensed milk, vinegar, sugar, and garlic. He called it by the doner name rather than gyros, but it came to be pronounced, and spelled, as donair. In 1973 Gamoulakos opened the first King of Donair restaurant on Quinpool Road in Halifax. In 2015, Halifax named donair the city's official food. Historically found only in Atlantic Canada, the dish's popularity has expanded to other parts of Canada in various forms.

==== Mexico ====
Al pastor is a variation of doner kebab via Lebanese shawarma. Literally meaning "in the style of the shepherd", it references the lamb often used in shawarma, though it is normally made with pork.

==== United States ====
Doner kebab is best known in the United States in its Greek variation, now known as gyros. Numerous people have made competing claims to have introduced the dish sometime in the 1960s, and its mass production in the 1970s. Originally known in Greece as ντονέρ (doner), by 1970 in the United States the newly coined name gyros was commonly in use, though it was still known in some Greek restaurants by both names into the 1970s. It was also available, possibly later, in some Turkish restaurants. In recent years a number of restaurants and food trucks specializing in doner kebab have opened in various parts of the country; a substantial percentage are owned by German immigrants.

=== Oceania ===
==== Australia ====
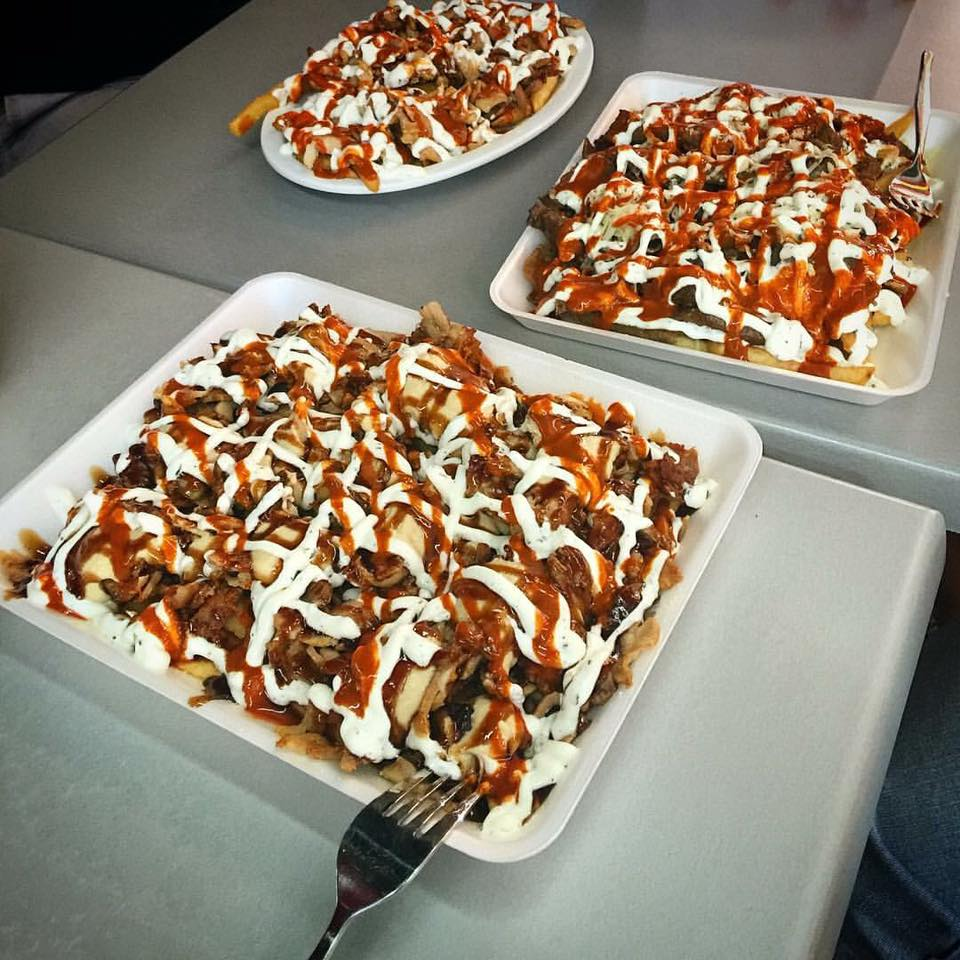
Halal snack packs in Sydney, Australia

With a multicultural population, the doner kebab in Australia competes with the Greek gyros and the Lebanese shawarma. Kebab sellers are subject to strict government food safety regulations.

A halal snack pack is a dish that originated in Australia. It consists of halal-certified doner kebab meat, chips (french fries), and sauces such as chili, garlic and barbecue. It is served in a cardboard container (formerly styrofoam) and has been described as a staple dish of takeaway kebab shops in Australia. The name of the dish was selected by the Macquarie Dictionary as the "People's choice Word of the Year" for 2016.

=== Caucasus, Middle East and Asia ===
==== Azerbaijan ====
In Azerbaijan, doner kebab (Azerbaijani: dönər), served similarly to the European style of sandwich wrapped in lavaş(flatbread) or in çörәk (bread, including tandoor bread), is one of the most widespread fast foods. It is usually made with әt (meat, essentially lamb or mutton), but sometimes toyuq (chicken).

==== Japan ====
A doner location in Ueno, Tokyo

In Japan, doner kebabs are now common, especially in Tokyo. They are predominantly made of chicken but occasionally beef, and called simply "kebab". The toppings include shredded lettuce or cabbage, sliced tomato, and usually a choice of sauces such as Thousand Island, spicy, and garlic.

==== Vietnam ====
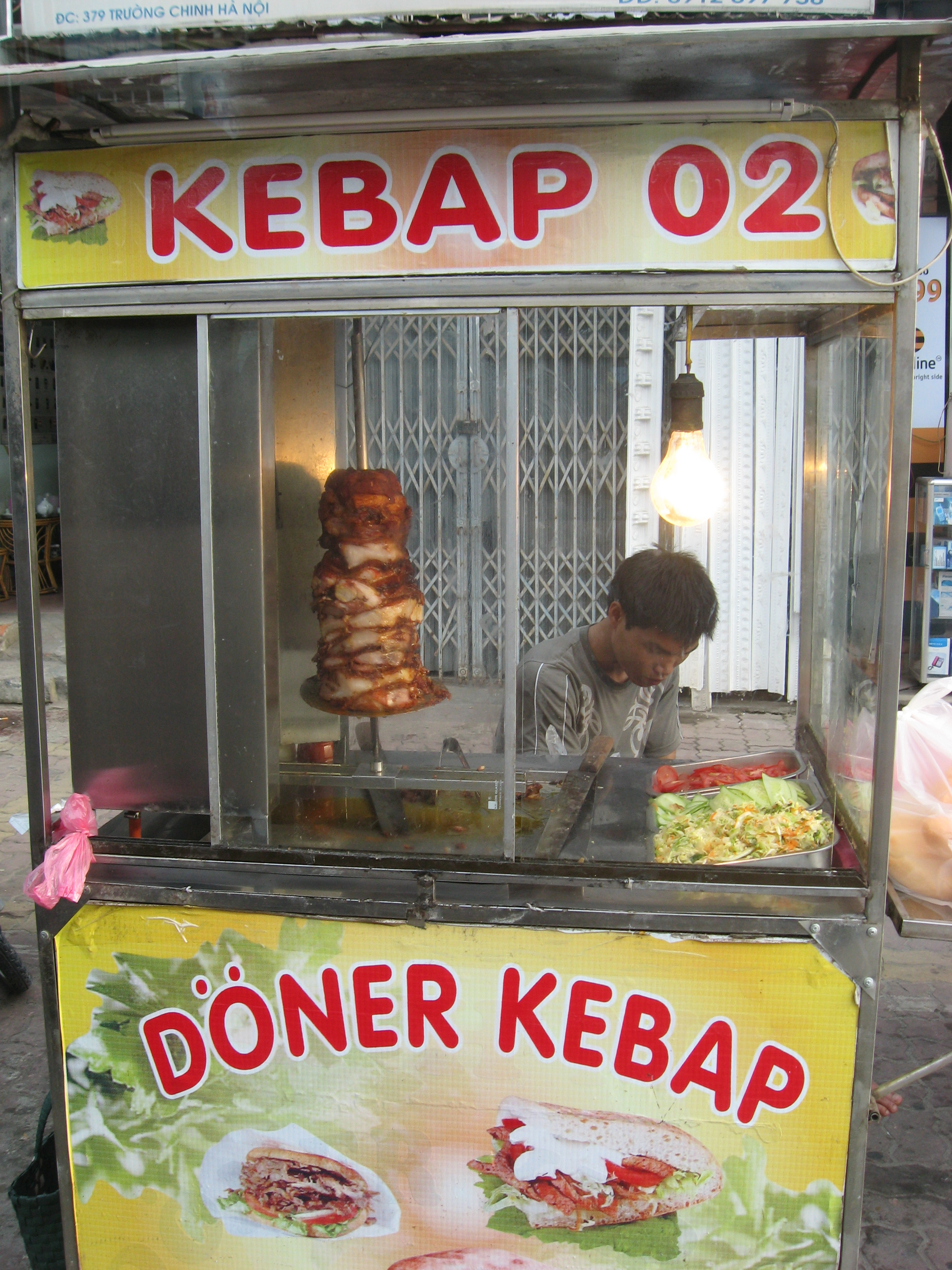
A döner street food cart in Hanoi, Vietnam

Doner kebab is increasingly becoming popular in Vietnam, mostly because of Vietnamese who used to live in Germany and introduced it to their homeland. Throughout Hanoi and Ho Chi Minh City many doner kebab stalls can be found. Bánh mỳ Döner Kebab, the Vietnamese version of the doner kebab, has some fundamental differences with the original doner kebab. First of all, pork is used instead of beef and lamb. Second, the meat is topped with sour vegetables and chili sauce.

== Health concerns ==
Health concerns regarding doner kebab, including the hygiene involved in overnight storage and re-heating of partially cooked meat, its quality, as well as high salt, fat, and calorie levels, have been reported in the media. Some investigations have found poor-quality ingredients in doner kebab meat, or meat types other than what was advertised.

Food safety regulations in most developed countries address the dangers of bacteria in undercooked meat of all kinds sold to the public. Some have guidelines specific to doner kebab handling and preparation. Following several outbreaks of E. coli food poisoning, the Canadian government in 2008 introduced a number of recommendations, including that the meat should be cooked a second time after being sliced from the rotisserie. In Germany, any doner kebab meat placed onto the rotisserie must be sold the same day. It is a violation of German health regulations to freeze partially cooked meat for sale at a later date.

== See also ==
- List of kebabs
- List of spit-roasted foods
