= Kebab shop =

Quick service food establishment

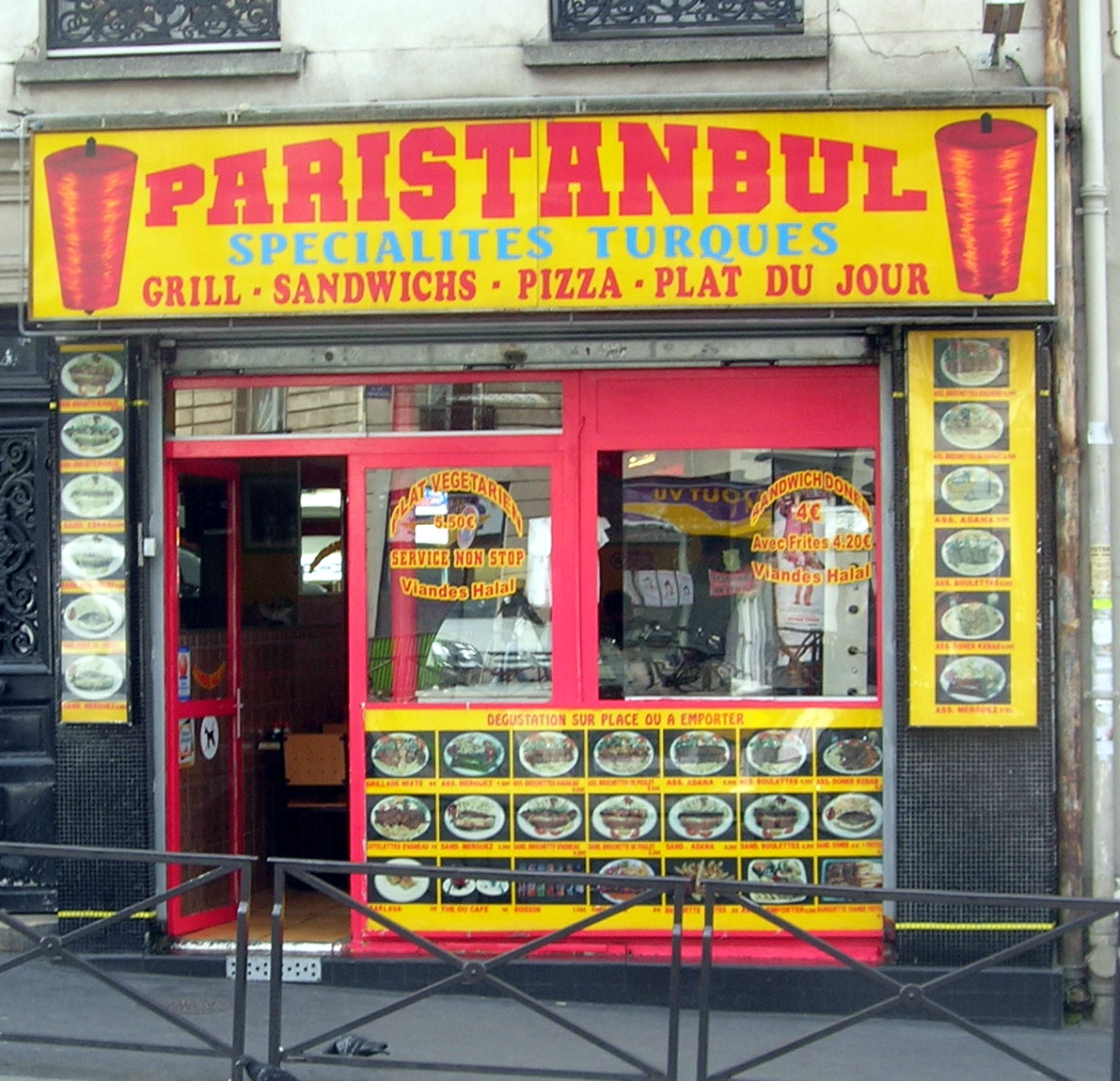
Kebab shop in Paris

A kebab shop is a quick service food establishment specialising in various fast food and street food dishes, primarily pizza, burgers, doner kebab and related sandwiches, including falafel.

Kebab shops originated in Europe, specifically Berlin with doner kebab brought by Turkish immigrants, as a natural evolution of influences from Turkey into Germany in the early 1970s, where doner kebab, iskender kebab, shish kebab and the like were served with fries and beer. Kebab shops have also spread to the United States, the United Kingdom, Canada, Australia and Ireland.
