= Gyros =

Greek dish

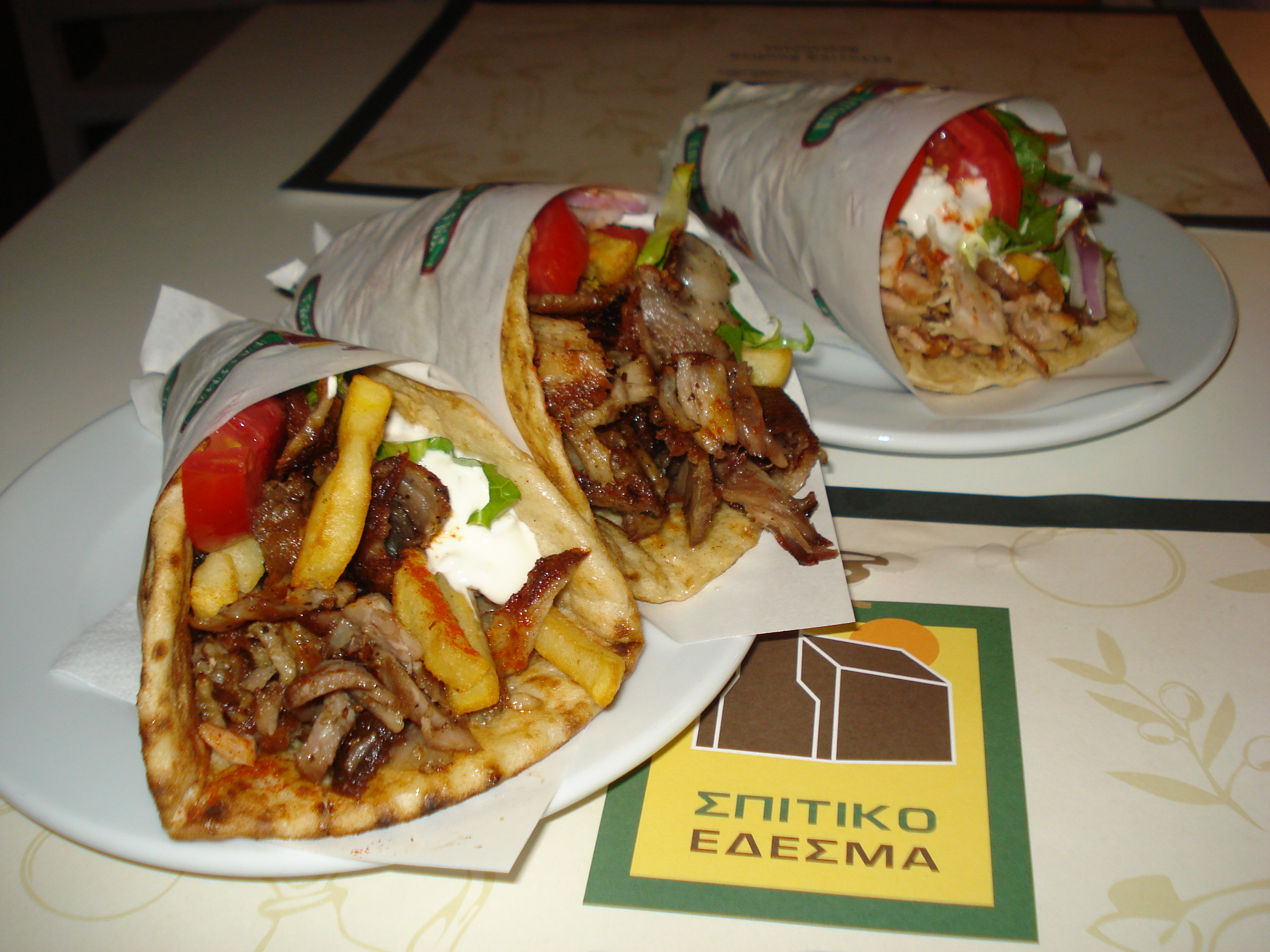
- Gyros in Greece, with meat, onions, tomato, lettuce, fried potatoes, and tzatziki rolled in a pita
- Alternative names: Gyro
- Type: Meat wrap
- Course: Main course
- Place of origin: Greece
- Serving temperature: Hot
- Main ingredients: Pita bread, pork, fried potatoes, lettuce, tomato, onions, tzatziki or yogurt
- Variations: Chicken, ground beef, or lamb instead of pork

Gyros, sometimes anglicized as a gyro (/ˈjɪəroʊ, ˈdʒɪər-, ˈdʒaɪr-/; Greek: γύρος, romanized: gýros/yíros, lit. 'turn', pronounced [ˈʝiros]), is a Greek dish consisting of meat cooked on a vertical rotisserie, then sliced and served wrapped or stuffed in pita bread, along with other ingredients such as tomato, onion, fried potatoes, and tzatziki. In Greece and Cyprus, authentic gyros is traditionally made with pork, though chicken is occasionally used as an alternative. Ground beef and lamb are sometimes used in other countries.

== Name ==
The name comes from the Greek γύρος (gýros, 'circle' or 'turn'). It is a calque of the Turkish döner, from dönmek, also meaning 'turn'. The name döner was formerly used in Greece, spelled ντονέρ. The word ντονέρ was criticized in Greece for being Turkish, and the word 'gyros' proposed to replace it. The word gyro or gyros was already in use in American English by at least 1970, and along with γύρος in Greek, came to replace doner kebab for the Greek version of the dish. Some Greek restaurants in the US continued to use both doner kebab and gyros to refer to the same dish in the 1970s.

In Greek, "gyros" is a nominative singular noun, but the final 's' is often interpreted in English usage as plural, leading to the singular back-formation "gyro". The standard Greek and English pronunciation is [ˈʝiɾos]. Some English speakers pronounce it /ˈdʒaɪroʊ/, because the word is a heteronym of the related word "gyro".

In Athens and other parts of southern Greece, the skewered meat dish elsewhere called souvlaki is known as kalamaki, while souvlaki is a term used generally for gyros, and similar dishes. In other regions, for example in Thessaloniki, gyros only refers to the meat on the spit, and what English speakers refer to as a "gyros wrap" is called a 'sandwich' (σάντουιτς).

=== Related dishes ===
Gyros is similar to other dishes such as the Arab shawarma, Canadian donair, and Mexican al pastor, all of which are derived from the Turkish doner kebab.

== History ==
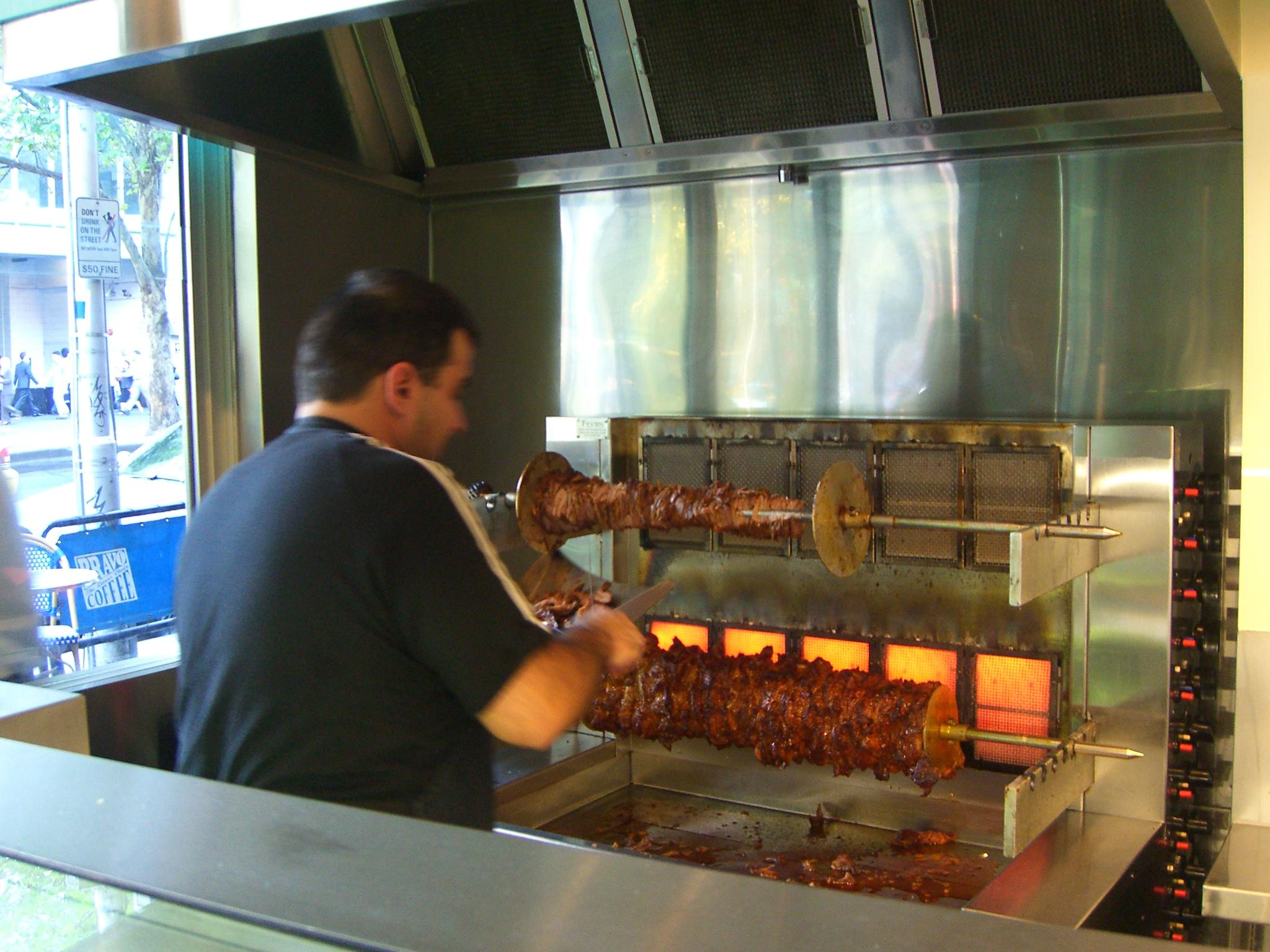
Lamb gyros being grilled

Grilling a vertical spit of stacked meat and slicing it off as it cooks was developed in the city of Bursa during the 19th century in the Ottoman Empire. After the 1922–23 population exchange between Greece and Turkey, the Greeks of Asia Minor brought their variation with them to Greece. Following World War II, gyros made with lamb was present in Athens. It was likely introduced by immigrants from Anatolia and the Middle East. The Greek version is normally made with pork and served with tzatziki, and became known as gyros.

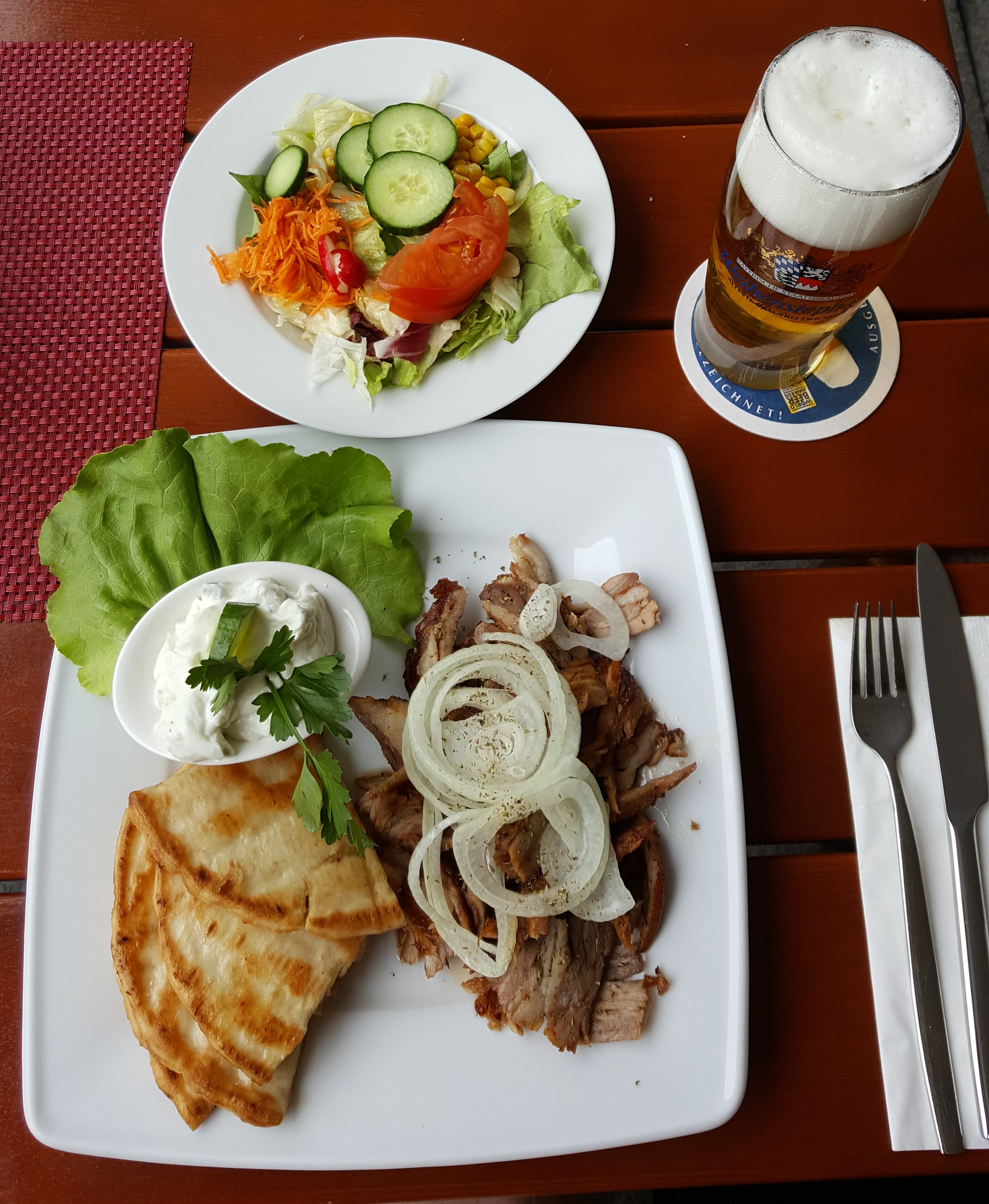
Gyros plate

By 1970, gyros wraps were already a popular fast food in Athens, as well as in Chicago and New York City. At that time, although vertical rotisseries were starting to be mass-produced in the US by Gyros Inc. of Chicago, the stacks of meat were still hand-made. There are several claimants to have introduced the first mass-produced gyros to the United States, all based in the Chicago area in the early 1970s, and of Greek descent. One of them, Peter Parthenis, has said that the mass-produced gyro was first conceptualized by John and Margaret Garlic; John Garlic was a Jewish car salesman who later ran a restaurant featuring live dolphins.

The Halifax donair in Canada which was based on the Greek gyros was invented in the 1970s by Peter Gamoulakos. Originally from Greece, he started selling Greek gyros (a pita stuffed with grilled lamb and tzatziki) from his restaurant located off the Bedford Highway.

== Preparation ==
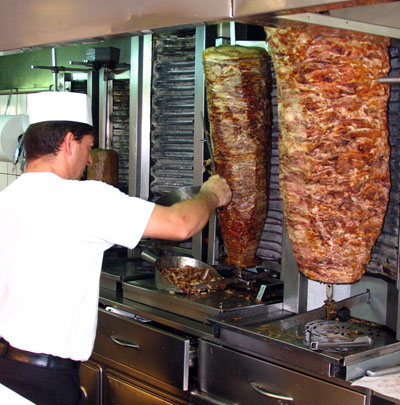
Gyros preparation

In Greece, gyros is normally made with pork, though other meats are used in other countries. Chicken is common, and lamb or beef may be found more rarely. Typical American mass-produced gyros are made with finely ground beef mixed with lamb.

For hand-made gyros, meat is cut into approximately round, thin, flat slices, which are then stacked on a spit and seasoned. Fat trimmings are usually interspersed. Spices may include cumin, oregano, thyme, rosemary, and others. The pieces of meat, in the shape of an inverted cone, are placed on a tall vertical rotisserie, which turns slowly in front of a source of heat or broiler. As the cone cooks, lower parts are basted with the juices running off the upper parts. The outside of the meat is sliced vertically in thin, crisp shavings when done.

The rate of roasting can be adjusted by varying the intensity of the heat, the distance between the heat and the meat, and the speed of spit rotation, thus allowing the cook to adjust for varying rates of consumption.

In Greece, it is customarily served in an oiled, lightly grilled piece of pita, rolled up with sliced tomatoes, chopped onions, and fried potatoes, sometimes topped with tzatziki, or, sometimes in northern Greece, ketchup or mustard.

== See also ==
- List of Greek dishes
- List of kebabs
- List of spit-roasted foods
