= İskender kebap =

Turkish meat dish (variety of "döner")

İskender kebab
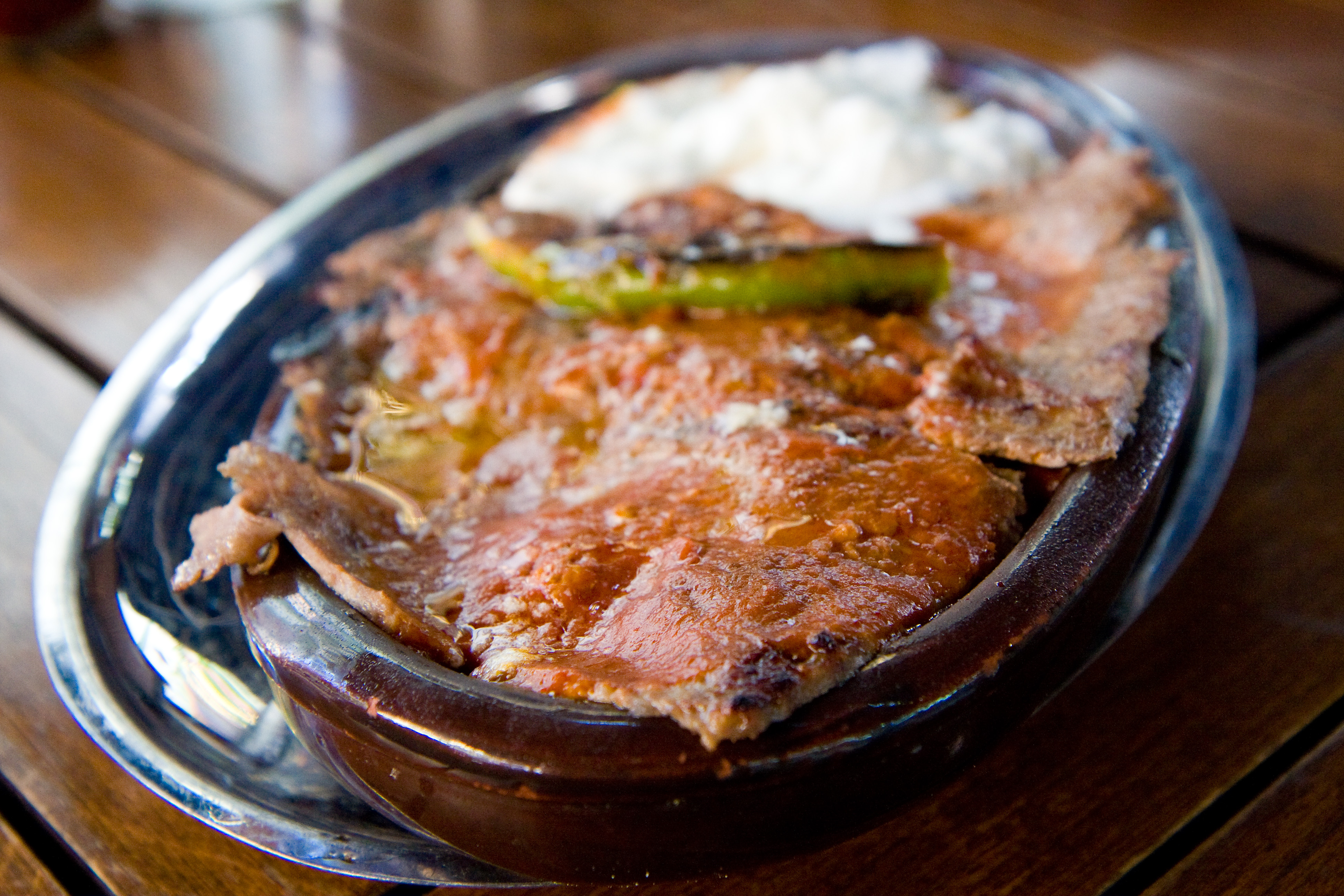
- İskender kebap from Istanbul
- Alternative names: Uludağ kebab Bursa kebab
- Course: Main dish + appetizer (yoghurt)
- Place of origin: Ottoman Empire
- Region or state: Bursa
- Created by: İskender Efendi
- Serving temperature: Hot
- Main ingredients: thinly cut grilled lamb, tomato sauce, pita bread, melted sheep butter and yogurt
- Food energy (per serving): 800–1,000 kcal (3,300–4,200 kJ)

İskender kebap is a Turkish dish that consists of sliced meat topped with hot tomato sauce over pieces of pita bread, and generously slathered with melted special sheep's milk butter and yogurt. It can be prepared from thinly cut grilled lamb or chicken. The prepared kebab is placed at a distance of 10–15 cm (3.9–5.9 in) from the previously lit fire and is cooked slowly, then it is cut thinly with a knife from top to bottom and is then served. Melted butter is generally poured over the dish at the table, for the customer's amusement.

It is one of the most popular dishes of Turkey. It takes its name from its inventor, İskender, who lived in Bursa in the late 19th century Ottoman Empire.

"Kebapçı İskender" is trademarked by the İskenderoğlu family, who still run the restaurant in Bursa. This dish is available in many restaurants throughout the country mostly under the name "İskender kebap", "Bursa kebabı", or at times with an alternative one made up by the serving restaurant such as "Uludağ kebabı".

== See also ==
- List of kebabs
- Turkish cuisine
