= McCain Foods =

Canadian frozen food company

McCain Foods Limited
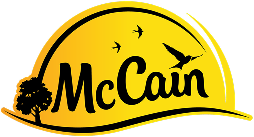
- Type: Private
- Industry: Frozen food
- Founded: Florenceville, New Brunswick, Canada (1957)
- Founders: Harrison McCain; Wallace McCain
- Headquarters: 439 King Street West, 5th Floor, Toronto, Ontario, Canada
- Area served: Worldwide
- Key people: James Scott McCain – Chairman; Max Koeune – President and CEO of McCain Foods Limited; Danielle Barran – President of McCain Foods (Canada)
- Products: French fries, appetizers, vegetables, desserts, entrees, and oven meals
- Revenue: ▲$14 billion CAD (2023)
- Number of employees: 20,000 (2023)
- Website: mccain.com

McCain Foods Limited is a Canadian multinational frozen food company established in 1957 in Florenceville, New Brunswick, Canada.

It is the world's largest manufacturer of frozen potato products, with 1 in 4 french fries in the world being a McCain fry. McCain maintains a global presence, with products sold in 160 countries, and operations in Canada, US, Brazil, UK, Ireland, France, Belgium, Netherlands, Poland, Australia, South Africa, India, Japan, China, New Zealand and more. Its major competitors are Simplot and Lamb Weston.

== History ==
=== 20th century ===
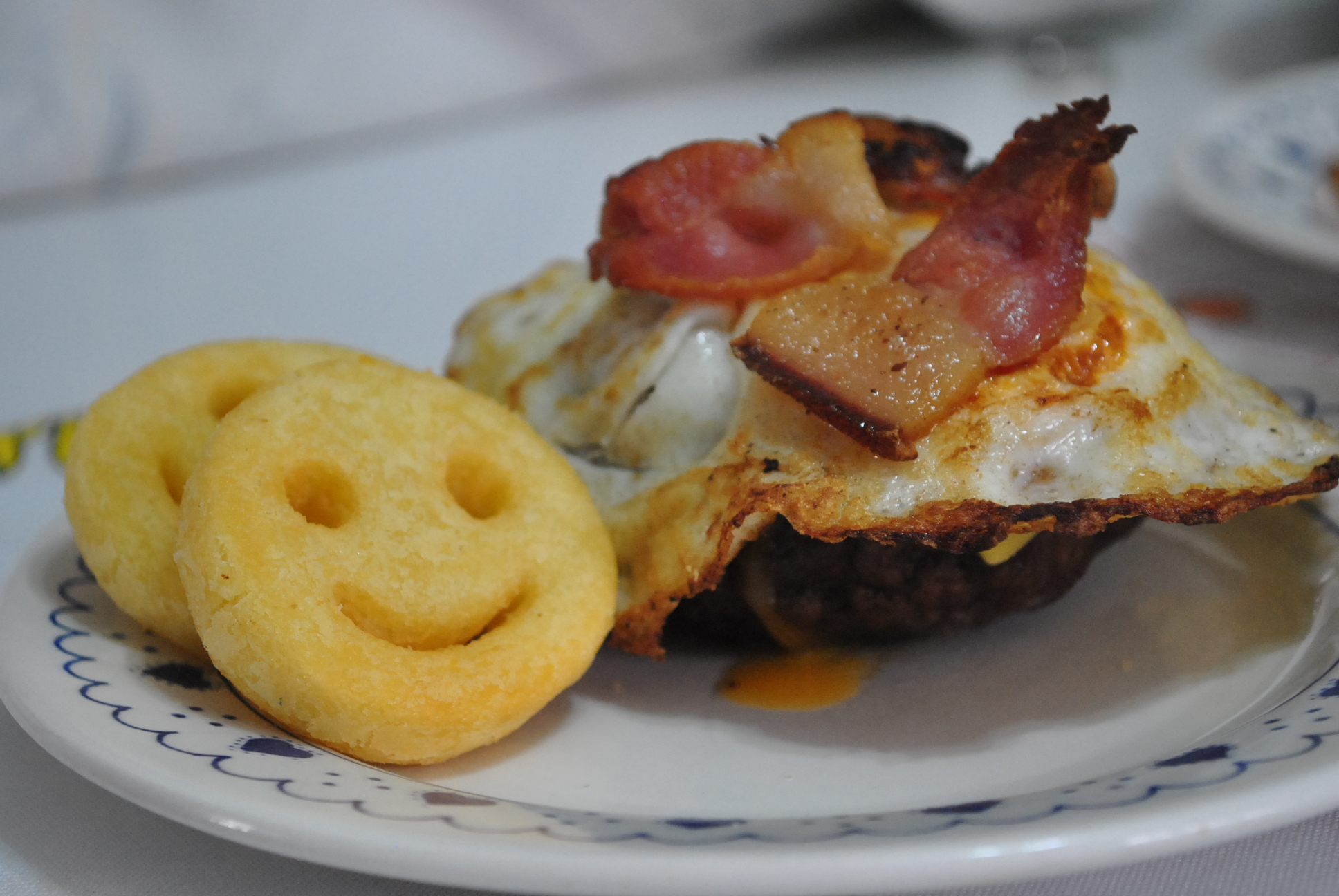
A plate with McCain Smiles, a face-shaped mashed potato bite.

McCain Foods was co-founded in 1957 by brothers Harrison McCain and Wallace McCain with the help of their two older brothers. The company's original plant was located on the bank of the Saint John River. In their first year of production, the company hired 30 employees and grossed over $150,000 in sales. Within four years, McCain products first reached England. In 1966, the company acquired trucking firm Day & Ross and went on to operate it as a wholly owned subsidiary. In 1968, McCain built a french fry plant in Scarborough, North Yorkshire, and began exporting to Australia. McCain first began exporting to the United States in 1969. In order to remain competitive, McCain focused on the Northeast region, saving on shipping costs and keeping prices low. It also began growing potatoes in Australia by 1970. McCain entered the European market In 1973, when it purchased a plant in Lewedorp, Netherlands.

In 1975, McCain purchased a potato-processing plant in Washburn, Maine, and its McCain Foods Inc. subsidiary was established. The company opened another facility in Easton, Maine, the following year. The company entered Germany in 1978 by establishing McCain GmbH in Frankfurt. In 1981, McCain opened a facility in Harnes, France, its first in the country. The company purchased a second Maine facility, on Presque Isle, from the J.R. Simplot Company in 1987. The two plants would process about 250 million pounds of frozen potato products in 1988. McCain was designated as an official supplier to Burger King in July 1988. It also acquired the Ellio's brand of frozen pizza from Dial Corporation in October. That year, the company also expanded outside the Northeast, acquiring facilities in Othello, Washington and Clark, South Dakota from Pete Taggares.

In 1990, the company purchased Tater Meal, a local company that had been making animal feed out of McCain's potato waste. By 1994, a feud between Harrison and Wallace over successorship resulted in Wallace being pushed out as co-chief executive. Wallace went on to buy Maple Leaf Foods the following year. In 1997, McCain bought the food service business of rival Ore-Ida for $500 million. The following year, the company sold its McCain Refrigerated Foods subsidiary to Dairyland Foods.

=== 2000s ===
In 2000, the company acquired Old South from Pasco Beverage Group. At the same time, it sold them McCain Citrus, including its three production facilities in Chicago, New Jersey and California. McCain purchased the production facilities and food service business of Anchor Food Products in 2001. In the same transaction, H.J. Heinz Company acquired Anchor's branded products. In 2002, McCain also acquired Wong Wing Foods Inc. Of Montreal, Canada's leading manufacturer of frozen Chinese entrées, egg rolls, and dim sum. In 2004, McCain opened a french fry production plant in Harbin, China. The company also opened a factory in Gujarat, India, in 2006. That June, the company purchased Jon-Lin, a manufacturer of vegetable-based appetizer products.

=== 2010s ===
In July 2012, the company acquired CelaVíta, a chilled potato producer in the Benelux region. It became a subsidiary of McCain Foods Holland. In December, McCain's Australian subsidiary acquired Kitchens of Sara Lee, including the rights to Sara Lee brand for the Pacific Rim market. Pinguin NV sold its Lutosa division to McCain in 2013. The transaction included the brand as well as two production facilities. In August 2014, the company sold its frozen pizza business, including Ellio's, to Dr. Oetker. That month, it also announced plans to close its facility in Prince Edwards Island, eliminating 121 jobs. Due to a shift in demand, it had become McCain's smallest and least utilized facility over the previous decade.

In April 2015, McCain announced the closure of its plant in Fort Atkinson, Wisconsin, and the elimination of 120 jobs. In December 2015, the company purchased Intevation Food Group and established the new Infinity Foods subsidiary focused on contract manufacturing. In March 2016, the company acquired a majority stake in frozen food manufacturer Van Geloven to expand its reach into Belgium, Netherlands, and Luxembourg. McCain launched the McCain Marché snack line in August, then announced the acquisition of Great American Appetizers in September 2016. It became McCain's Great American Snack subsidiary. Two years later, its Monroe, North Carolina, factory was closed.

By 2017, the company was the world's largest manufacturer of frozen potato products, and has over 20,000 employees and 47 production facilities in six continents. The company generated more than $8.5 billion in annual sales.

In 2017, McCain announced that it would source 100% cage-free eggs by 2025.

In 2018, McCain acquired 49% of Brazilian cheese bread company Forno de Minas Alimentos SA.

In January 2019, the company announced the closure of its production plant in Colton, California, laying off about 100 workers. The facility had been at the center of a large recall only months earlier. McCain announced it had acquired a 70% stake in Sérya, a Brazilian frozen food company, in May.

=== 2020s ===
In 2020, the company announced it would invest $200 million to build a second potato production plant in China, based in the Yangling Agriculture Hi-Tech Development Zone in Shaanxi Province. McCain announced in February 2021 that it had sold a majority stake in Wong Wing. It also became the largest shareholder of vertical-farming business TruLeaf, following an initial investment in 2018. That August, it also sold its Sara Lee frozen baked goods and desserts business in Australia to New Zealand investment firm South Island Office. In September, it revealed The Simple Root, a new line of dairy-alternatives made with potato and other root vegetables, for the US, Canada, and UK markets.

Following the Russian invasion of Ukraine in February 2022, McCain suspended all shipments into the Russian market and scrapped its plan to build a factory in the country. In June, the company purchased predictive crop intelligence technologies from Resson. Then, in July, it entered into a partnership with NUGGS, whereby McCain would produce the company's plant-based chicken nuggets. McCain opened its first production unit in Brazil in August and then acquired the Netherlands-based Scelta Products in September.

The company announced in March 2024 that it had sold CelaVita to a Dutch investment group. In April 2024, after having acquired a minority stake in 2021, McCain bought Strong Roots, a plant-based frozen food company headquartered in Dublin, Ireland. In July, it announced plans to discontinue its Fries To go line and close its Lincolnshire factory. In September, it sold frozen-pizza brand Sibarita and a manufacturing plant to Molinos Río de la Plata in Argentina.

In 2024, McCain Foods was named in a class action lawsuits along with Cavendish Farms, Lamb Weston, and Simplot in a conspiracy to coordinate prices on frozen potatoes. The four firms, which control 98% of the potato market in the United States, are alleged to have coordinated price increases starting in 2021.

In May 2025, McCain subsidiary Van Geloven announced it would close three of its six production plants in Belgium and Netherlands, affecting 142 jobs.

In November 2025, it was announced McCain had acquired the Washburn, Maine-headquartered supplier of frozen potato specialty products, Penobscot McCrum (McCrum) for an undisclosed amount.

In late March 2026, it was announced McCain ANZ would be closing the Hastings, New Zealand vegetable processing plant on January 31, 2027. In late July 2026, Hawke's Bay horticulturalists abandoned plans to pause the sale of the Hastings processing plant after McCain ANZ informed them and local authorities that the processing equipment was no longer available.

=== Controversy ===
In 2026, McCain Foods faced a campaign by the animal protection organization Animal Equality over the use of eggs from caged hens in Brazil. The campaign focused on Forno de Minas, a Brazilian company owned by McCain, which had committed in 2018 to sourcing cage-free eggs in Brazil by 2025. McCain's 2025 Sustainability Report stated that the company had achieved its global commitment to source 100% cage-free eggs by 2025, while also stating that Forno de Minas had not met its Brazilian target and that its transition to cage-free egg sourcing had been extended to 2030.The discrepancy between McCain's global reporting and the delayed Brazilian target became a focus of the campaign.

The campaign received coverage in Canada in July 2026, when Global News reported on the criticism of McCain's cage-free commitment in Brazil and the company's response.

== UK operations ==
McCain Foods' UK subsidiary has a factory in Scarborough, North Yorkshire; the subsidiary sponsored the former football stadium in the town until the football team was dissolved on June 20, 2007. There is also a plant at Whittlesey, Cambridgeshire, and a cold store in Easton, Lincolnshire.

A legal case in which McCain Foods (GB) Ltd sued Eco-Tec (Europe) Ltd. was decided by the High Court in 2011. McCain had ordered a system intended to remove hydrogen sulphide from biogas produced in its waste water treatment plant, which would allow the gas to produce power and heat for the Whittlesey plant. The system proved to be "impossible to commission successfully" and so McCain sued for compensation. The court's ruling confirmed that Eco-Tec were in breach of their contract. Legally, the court took a broadly inclusive approach to the scope of the losses incurred by McCain and the damages due to them, declining to treat a number of items as "consequential losses" for which Eco-Tec sought protection under a contractual exclusion clause.
