= Hein Deprez =

Belgian businessman

Hein Deprez (born in Wilrijk, 6 August 1961) is a Belgian businessman. He is co-founder, majority shareholder, and co-CEO of Greenyard, an international food sector company. He is founder and CEO of the Univeg group, a multinational in the vegetable and fruit sector. As a patron, he has purchased historically valuable estates and had them restored.

== Life ==
=== Univeg ===
Hein Deprez's grandfather had a farming business in the Westhoek, but started working in the Port of Antwerp and moved to the Waasland. Deprez quit his studies at the age of 21. In 1983, he started as a mushroom grower in Belsele. His business expanded considerably through several acquisitions. In 1987, he started Univeg, growing the company through mergers and acquisitions in the Netherlands (Bakker Barendrecht), France (Katopé), Germany (Atlanta AG, the German distribution branch of Chiquita), Italy (Bocchi) and Turkey (Alara) into a corporation operating in 25 countries with a turnover of 3.3 billion euros. The Univeg group consists of four business units: vegetables and fruit, flowers and plants, convenience, and logistics and transport, with a workforce of 9,500 people.

In addition, Deprez is the largest shareholder of the listed food group PinguinLutosa from Westrozebeke, which took over Scana Noliko from Bree for € 115 million in 2011.

From January 2016 to December 2019, he was a director of the Antwerp Port Authority. In 2017, he became chairman of the Queen Elisabeth Medical Foundation (GSKE).

=== Greenyard ===
In mid-2015, the activities of Univeg and Peltracom were bundled into the Greenyard Foods Group. For their contributions, the shareholders of Univeg and Peatinvest received 25.5 million new shares. After the transaction, Deprez and his sister Veerle are the main shareholders with 51% of the shares. The family has indicated they want to sell shares but will retain at least 30% of the shares.

=== Castles and Estates ===
Deprez made the news in 2011 with the purchase of the historic Male Castle in Bruges. That same year, he also became owner of Castle Ter Eiken in Klein-Sinaai.

In their hometown of Belsele, the Deprez family has owned the Episcopal Estate and the surrounding green zone since 2004. It has become a green belt that is open to the public, with a promise not to build there for the first thirty years.
