= Zoodles =

Zoodles may refer to:

- Zucchini noodles produced using a spiral vegetable slicer
- Heinz Zoodles, a brand of canned animal-shaped wheat pasta and tomato sauce, sold in Canada by Heinz
