= Curly fries =

Variation of french fries

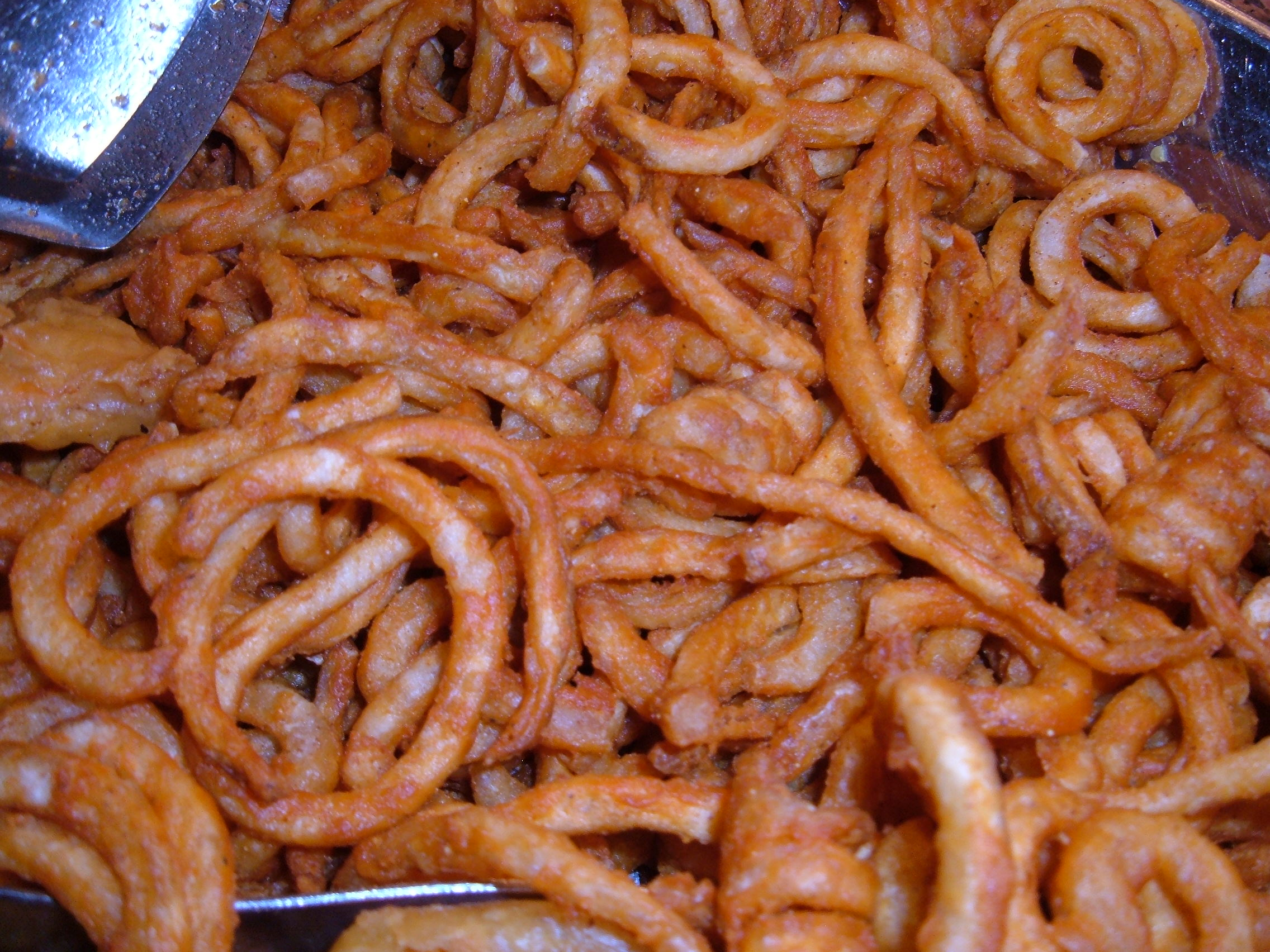
- Curly fries in a metal bowl
- Type: French fries
- Associated cuisine: United States
- Main ingredients: Potatoes, paprika, black pepper, garlic powder, onion powder
- Variations: Tornado potatoes

Curly fries, or twisted fries or spiral fries, are french fries cut into a spiral shape. Though they are sometimes said to have been invented by the Arby's restaurant chain, their actual origins are more complex; their existence can be traced back to the 19th century. The curly fry shape can also be produced with a spiral vegetable slicer, spiral scissors, or industrial means.

== Description ==
Curly fries are french fries cut into a spiral shape. In New York, they are typically seasoned with a distinct spice mix composed primarily of paprika, black pepper, onion powder, and garlic powder.

== Origins ==
Though they are sometimes said to have been invented by the Arby's restaurant chain, their actual origins are more complex. The creation date of the curly fry has not been pinpointed, but its existence can be traced back to the 19th century. Oklahoma City's Dolores Restaurant and Inn served curly fries as "Suzi-Q potatoes" in 1938.

In the 1980s, Washington company TaterBoy debuted industrial "Curley Fries". The first company to produce curly fries in mass quantities is Simplot, which used the specific blend of spices that became popular.

Arby's is well known for curly fries, but they did not introduce them until 1988. However, Arby's may have been the first company to utilize Cajun-style seasoning on their "Curly-Q Fries".

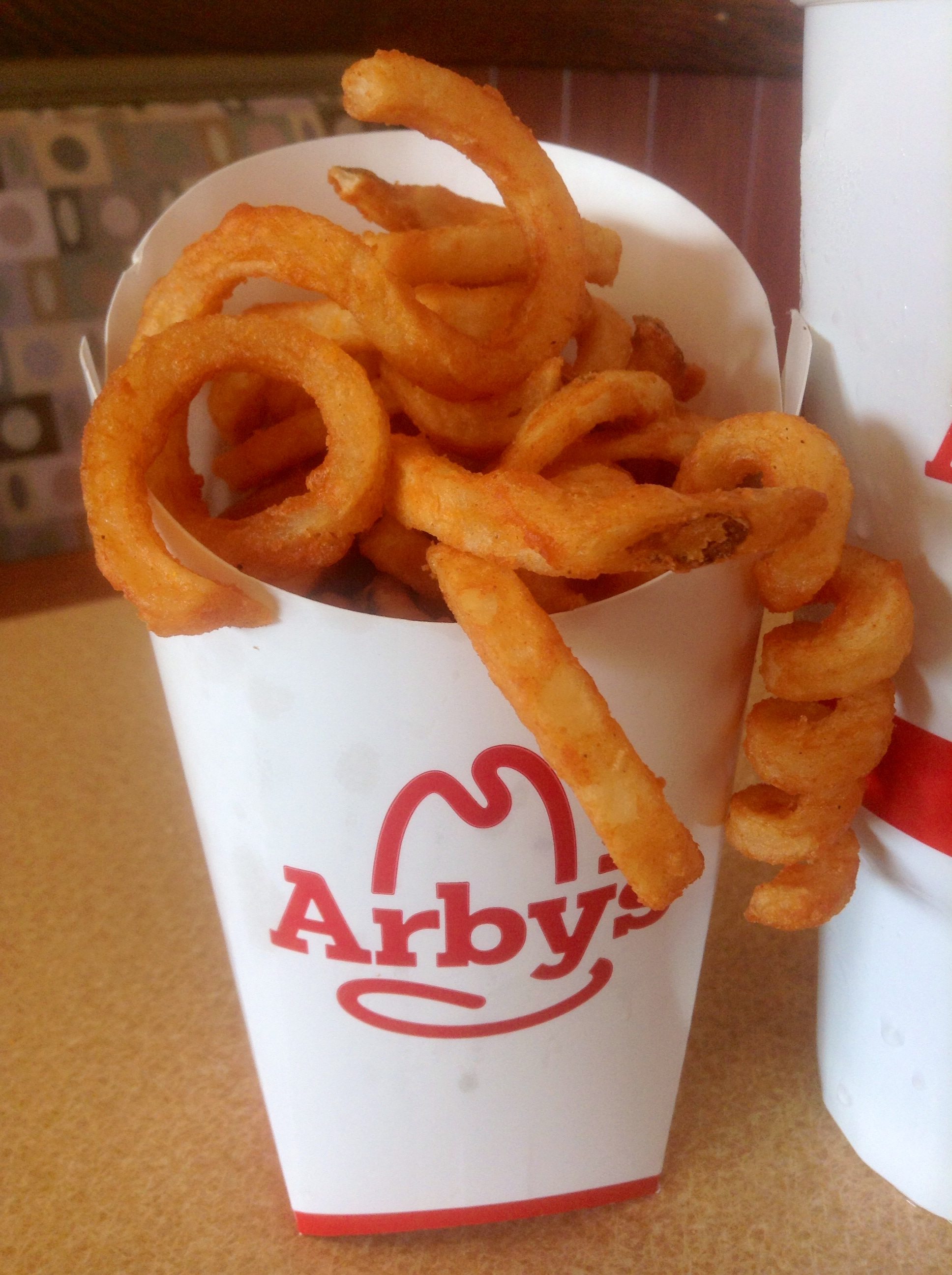
Arby's curly fries

== Preparation ==
The curly fry shape can also be produced with a spiral vegetable slicer or spiral scissors.

Conagra, the company which produces Arby's curly fries, uses powerful industrial machinery such as spiralizers to turn whole potatoes into the curly fry shape. For the spiral vegetable slicers, the potatoes are cleaned, then are propelled through a set of pipes at 60 miles per hour by water. In the pipes, the potatoes are held in place and sliced by rotating blades, producing a spiral that has been found to go over two and a half feet long when stretched out. The fries are then blanched, dried, battered with a mixture with the seasoning inside, fried, frozen, and refried at the restaurant
