= French fries =

Deep-fried strips of potato

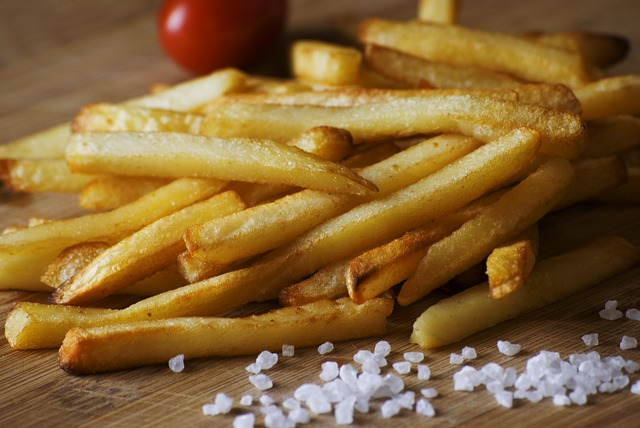
- A pile of French fries sprinkled with coarse salt
- Alternative names: Chips; finger chips; fries; frites; hot chips; steak fries; slap chips
- Course: Side dish or snack, rarely as a main dish
- Place of origin: France and Belgium
- Serving temperature: Hot
- Main ingredients: Potatoes; Oil; Salt
- Variations: Curly fries; shoestring fries; steak fries; sweet potato fries; chilli cheese fries; poutine; crinkle cut fries; waffle fries
- Other information: Often served with salt and ketchup, mayonnaise, vinegar, barbecue sauce or other sauces

French fries, (Note: Spoken in North American English) or simply fries, also known as French fried potatoes, chips, (Note: Spoken in British English and other national varieties) and finger chips, (Note: Spoken in Indian English) are batonnet or julienne-cut deep-fried potatoes of disputed origin. They are prepared by cutting potatoes into even strips, drying them, and frying them, usually in a deep fryer. Pre-cut, blanched, and frozen russet potatoes are widely used, and sometimes baked in a regular or convection oven, such as an air fryer.

French fries are served hot, either soft or crispy, and are generally eaten as part of lunch or dinner or by themselves as a snack, and they commonly appear on the menus of diners, fast food restaurants, pubs, and bars. They are typically salted and may be served with ketchup, mustard, vinegar, mayonnaise, barbecue sauce, tomato sauce, or other sauces. French fries can be topped more heavily, as in the dishes of poutine, loaded fries or chilli cheese fries, and are occasionally made from sweet potatoes instead of potatoes.

== Preparation ==
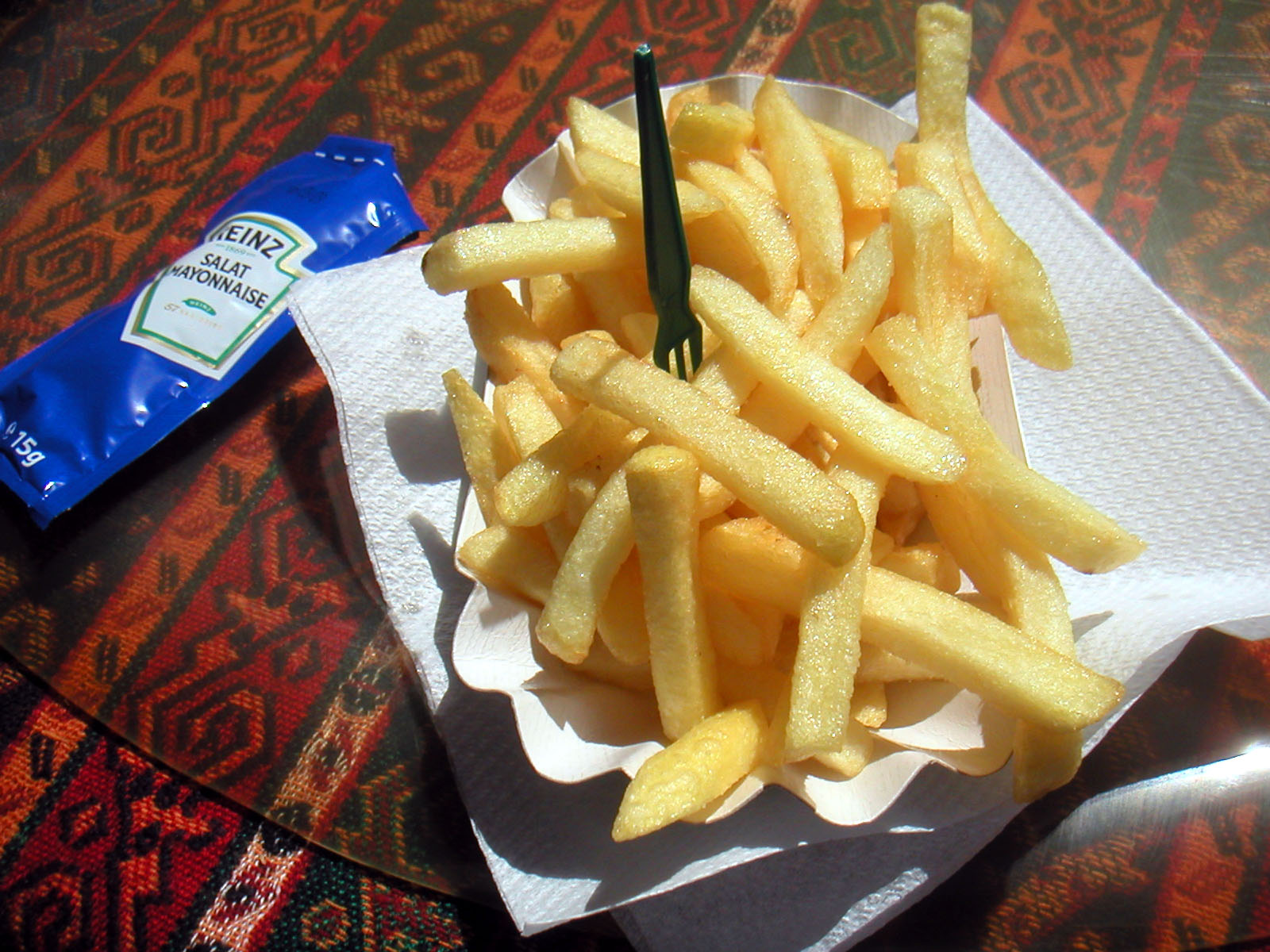
Pommes frites accompanied with a mayonnaise packet

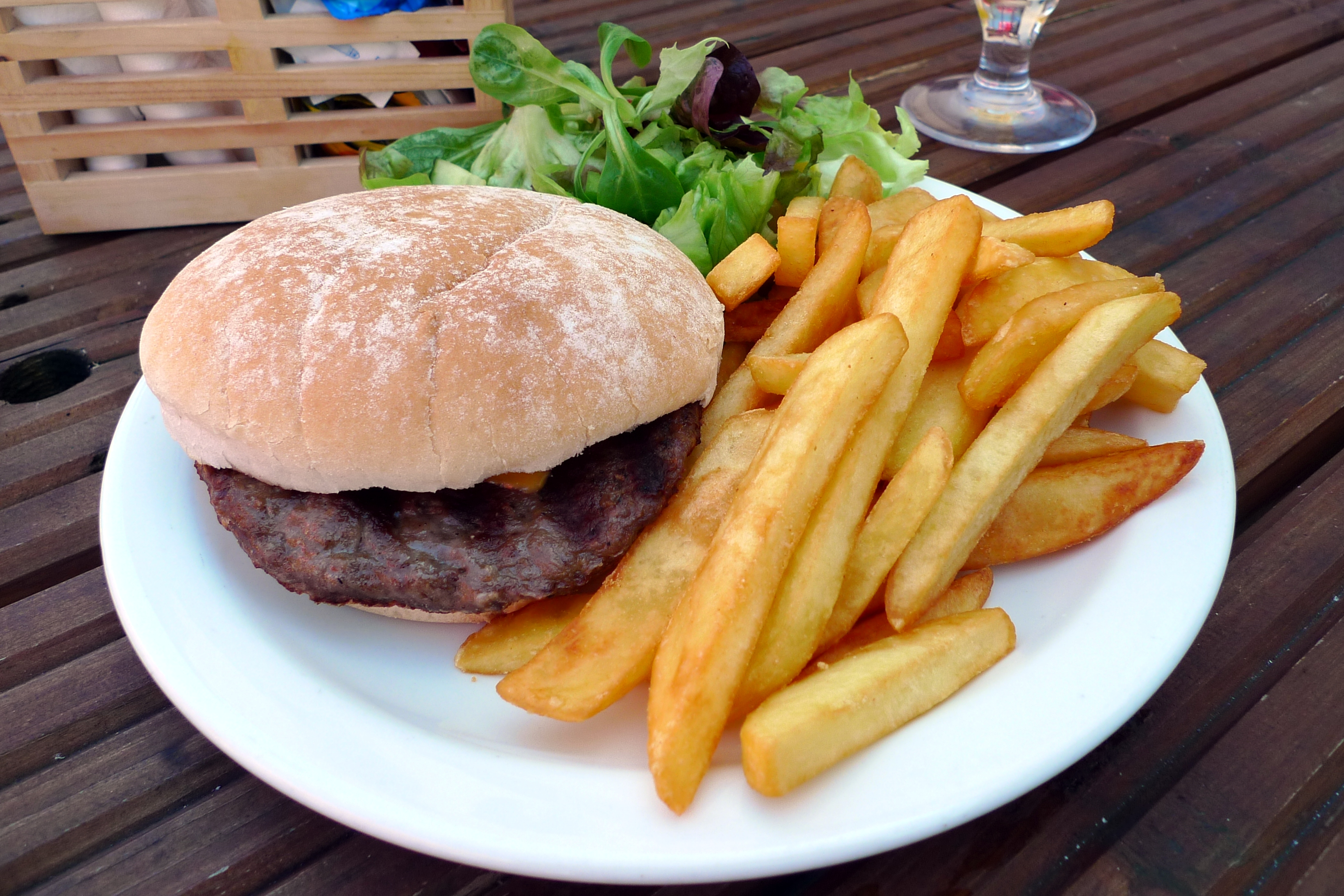
A hamburger with crispy fries

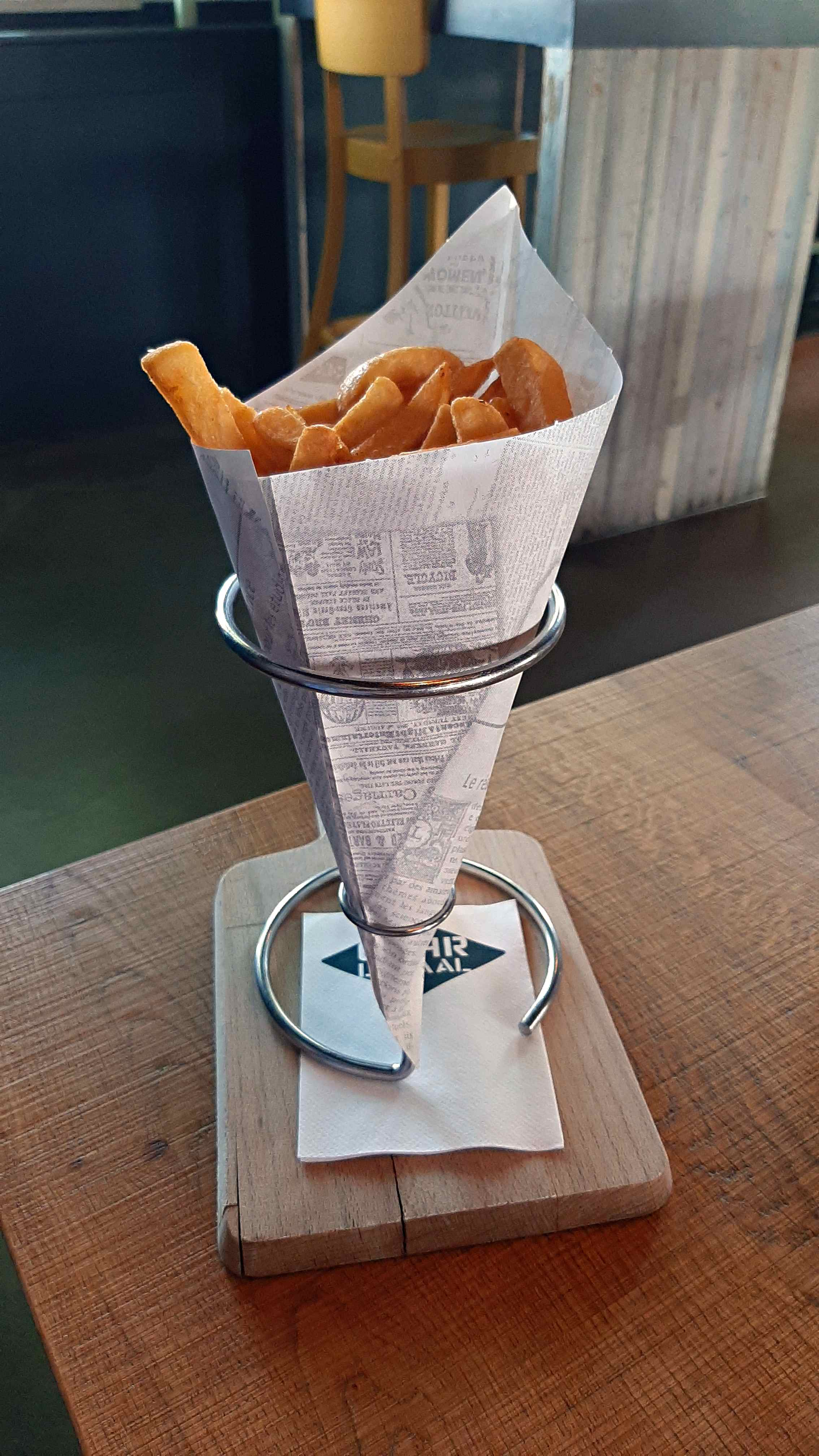
Fries as a snack in a Dutch restaurant

The standard method for cooking French fries is deep frying, which submerges them in a hot fat, typically oil.

The potatoes are prepared by first cutting them (peeled or unpeeled) into even strips, which are then wiped off or soaked in cold water to remove the surface starch, and thoroughly dried. They may then be fried in one or two stages. Chefs generally agree that the two-bath technique produces better results. Freshly harvested potatoes have a high moisture content that results in a soggy texture when fried; consequently, stored potatoes are preferred for crisp fries.

In the two-stage or two-bath method, the first bath, sometimes called blanching, is in hot fat (around 160 °C/320 °F) to cook the fries through. This step can be done in advance. Then they are more briefly fried in very hot fat (190 °C/375 °F) to crisp the exterior. They are then placed in a colander or on a cloth to drain, then served. The exact times of the two baths depend on the size of the fries. For example, for 2–3 mm strips, the first bath takes about 3 minutes, and the second bath takes only seconds.

Since the 1960s, most French fries in the US have been produced from frozen Russet potatoes which have been blanched or at least air-dried industrially. The usual fat for making French fries is vegetable oil. In the past, beef suet was recommended as superior, with vegetable shortening as an alternative. McDonald's used a mixture of 93% beef tallow and 7% cottonseed oil until 1990, when they changed to vegetable oil with beef flavouring. Horse fat was standard in northern France and Belgium until recently, and is recommended by some chefs.

=== Chemical and physical changes ===
French fries are fried in a two-step process: the first time is to cook the starch throughout the entire cut at low heat, and the second time is to create the golden crispy exterior of the fry at a higher temperature. This is necessary because if the potato cuts are only fried once, the temperature would either be too hot, causing only the exterior to be cooked and not the inside, or not hot enough where the entire fry is cooked, but its crispy exterior will not develop. Although the potato cuts may be baked or steamed as a preparation method, this section will only focus on French fries made using frying oil. During the initial frying process (approximately 150°C), water on the surface of the cuts evaporates off the surface and the water inside the cuts gets absorbed by the starch granules, causing them to swell and produce the fluffy interior of the fry.

The starch granules are able to retain the water and expand due to gelatinisation. The water and heat break the glycosidic linkages between amylopectin and amylose strands, allowing a new gel matrix to form via hydrogen bonds which aid in water retention. The moisture that gets trapped within the gel matrix is responsible for the fluffy interior of the fry. The gelatinised starch molecules move towards the surface of the fries "forming a thick layer of gelatinised starch" and this layer of pre-gelatinised starch becomes the crisp exterior after the potato cuts are fried for a second time. During the second frying process (approximately 180 °C), the remaining water on the surface of the cuts evaporates and the gelatinised starch molecules that collected towards the potato surface are cooked again, forming the crisp exterior. The golden-brown colour of the fry will develop when the amino acids and glucose on the exterior participate in a Maillard browning reaction.

== Name and etymology ==
In the United States and most of Canada, the term French fries or French fried potatoes (also written as french fries or French-fried potatoes), or shortened to fries, refers to all dishes of fried elongated pieces of potatoes. Variants in shape and size may have names such as curly fries, shoestring fries, etc.

In Great Britain, Australia, South Africa, Ireland and New Zealand, the term chips is generally used, being a popular dish in most Commonwealth countries. However, the term French fries or skinny fries is used for thinly cut fried potatoes which are distinguished from the more traditional thick cut chips.

In the US or Canada, these more thickly-cut chips might be called steak fries, depending on the shape, while the word chips is more often used in North America to refer to potato chips, commonly known in the UK, Ireland and South Africa as crisps. In Australia and New Zealand, chips are often referred to as hot chips to distinguish them from potato chips, although the type of 'chip' is often implied through context.

Thomas Jefferson had "potatoes served in the French manner" at a White House dinner in 1802. The expression "French fried potatoes" first occurred in print in English in the 1856 work Cookery for Maids of All Work by Eliza Warren: "French Fried Potatoes. – Cut new potatoes in thin slices, put them in boiling fat, and a little salt; fry both sides of a light golden brown colour; drain." This account referred to thin, shallow-fried slices of potato. It is not clear where or when the now familiar deep-fried batons or fingers of potato were first prepared. In the early 20th century, the term "French fried" was used in the sense of "deep-fried" for foods like onion rings or chicken.

The term was in use in the United States as early as 1880. An 1899 item in Good Housekeeping specifically references Kitchen Economy in France: "The perfection of French fries is due chiefly to the fact that plenty of fat is used." One legend about the name "French fries" claims that when the American Expeditionary Forces arrived in Belgium during World War I, they assumed that chips were a French dish because French was spoken in the Belgian Army. But the name was used long before that in English, even in the U.S. Army, and the popularity of the term did not increase for decades after 1917.

== Origin ==
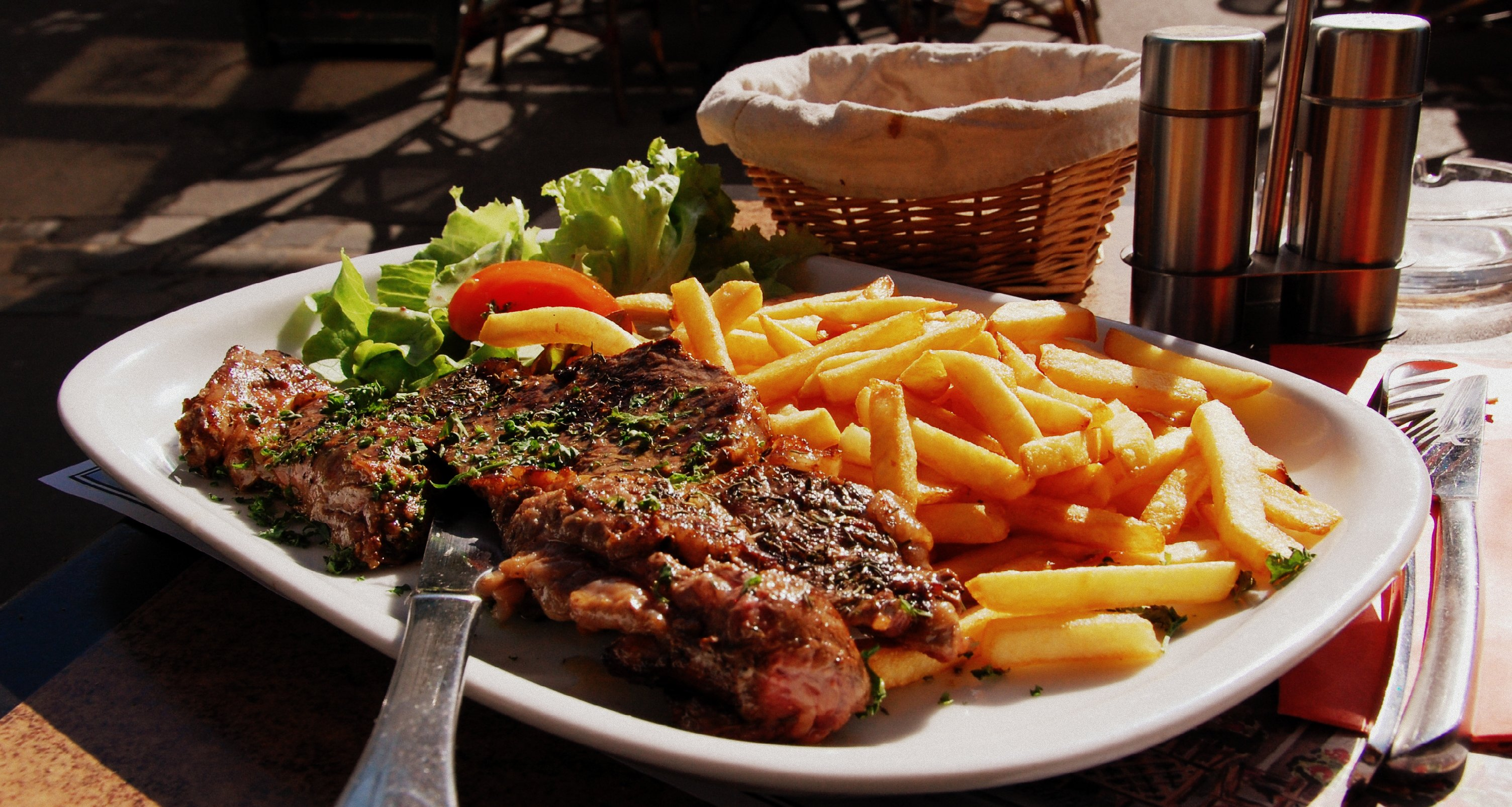
Steak frites in Fontainebleau, France

=== Chile ===
The oldest documents where a fried potato is mentioned are from Chile in 1629 in the city of Nacimiento, extracted from Happy Captivity, written in 1673 by Chilean Francisco Núñez de Pineda, where he narrates his experiences as a captive war soldier in 1629 at the hands of Mapuche warriors. In the text, he mentioned eating "papas fritas" (fried potatoes) in 1629 and Mapuche women "sent fried and stewed potatoes" to the chiefs. The exact shape is unclear, likely wide slices or cubes fried in lamb or guanaco tallow which was customary. However, the cane shape originates from Europe.

=== Spain ===
French fries in their current form may have been invented in Spain, the first European country in which the potato appeared from the New World colonies. Professor Paul Ilegems, curator of the Frietmuseum in Bruges, Belgium, believes that Saint Teresa of Ávila of Spain cooked the first French fries, and refers also to the tradition of frying in Mediterranean cuisine as evidence.

=== Belgian–French dispute ===
The Belgians and French have an ongoing dispute about where fries were invented.

The Belgian food historian Pierre Leclercq has traced the history of the French fry and asserts that "it is clear that fries are of French origin". They became an emblematic Parisian dish in the 19th century. Frédéric Krieger, a Bavarian musician, learned to cook fries at a roaster on rue Montmartre in Paris in 1842, and took the recipe to Belgium in 1844, where he created his business, Fritz, and sold "la pomme de terre frite à l'instar de Paris" ("Paris-style fried potatoes"). The modern style of fries born in Paris around 1855 is different from the domestic fried potato that existed in the 18th century.

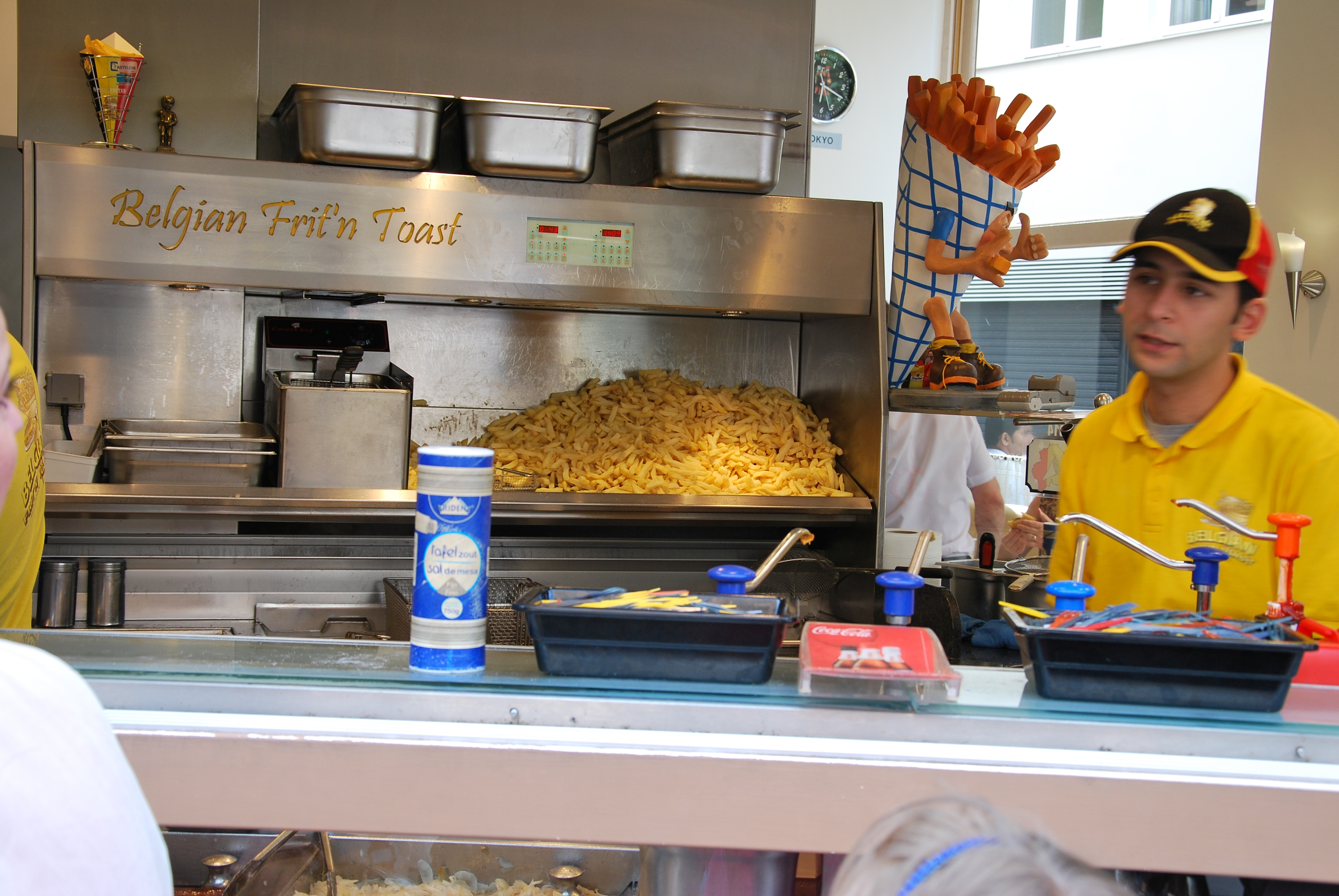
A Belgian frites shop

From the Belgian standpoint, the popularity of the term "French fries" is explained as "French gastronomic hegemony" into which the cuisine of Belgium was assimilated, because of a lack of understanding coupled with a shared language and geographic proximity of the countries. The Belgian journalist Jo Gérard claimed that a 1781 family manuscript recounts that potatoes were deep-fried prior to 1680 in the Meuse valley, as a substitute for frying fish when the rivers were frozen. Gérard never produced the manuscript that supports this claim, and "the historical value of this story is open to question". In any case, it is unrelated to the later history of the French fry, as the potato did not arrive in the region until around 1735; furthermore, given 18th-century economic conditions: "it is absolutely unthinkable that a peasant could have dedicated large quantities of fat for cooking potatoes. At most they were sautéed in a pan".

== Global use ==
=== Belgium ===
Fries are very popular in Belgium, where they are known as frieten (in Flemish) or frites (in Belgian French), and the Netherlands, where they are known as patat in the north and, in the south, friet(en). In Belgium, fries are sold in shops called frietkot/frituur (Flemish), friteries (French), Fritüre/Frittüre (German) or snackbar (Dutch in The Netherlands). They are served with a large variety of Belgian sauces and eaten either on their own or with other snacks. Traditionally, fries are served in a cornet de frites (French), patatzak/frietzak/fritzak (Dutch/Flemish), or Frittentüte (German), a white cardboard cone, then wrapped in paper, with a spoonful of sauce (often mayonnaise) on top.

=== France ===
In France and other French-speaking countries, fried potatoes are formally pommes de terre frites, but more commonly pommes frites ("fried apples"), patates frites, or simply frites. The words aiguillettes ("needle-ettes") or allumettes ("matchsticks") are used when the French fries are very small and thin. One enduring origin story holds that French fries were invented by street vendors on the Pont Neuf bridge in Paris in 1789, just before the outbreak of the French Revolution. However, a reference exists in France from 1775 to "a few pieces of fried potato" and to "fried potatoes". Eating potatoes for sustenance was promoted in France by Antoine-Augustin Parmentier, but he did not mention fried potatoes in particular. A note in a manuscript in U.S. president Thomas Jefferson's hand (circa 1801–1809) mentions "Pommes de terre frites à cru, en petites tranches" ("Potatoes deep-fried while raw, in small slices"). The recipe almost certainly comes from his French chef, Honoré Julien. The thick-cut fries are called pommes Pont-Neuf or simply pommes frites (about 10 mm or 3/8 in); thinner variants are pommes allumettes (matchstick potatoes; about 7 mm or 1/4 in), and pommes paille (potato straws; 4 mm or 1/8 in). Pommes gaufrettes are waffle fries. A popular dish in France is steak frites, which is steak accompanied by thin French fries.

=== Germany ===
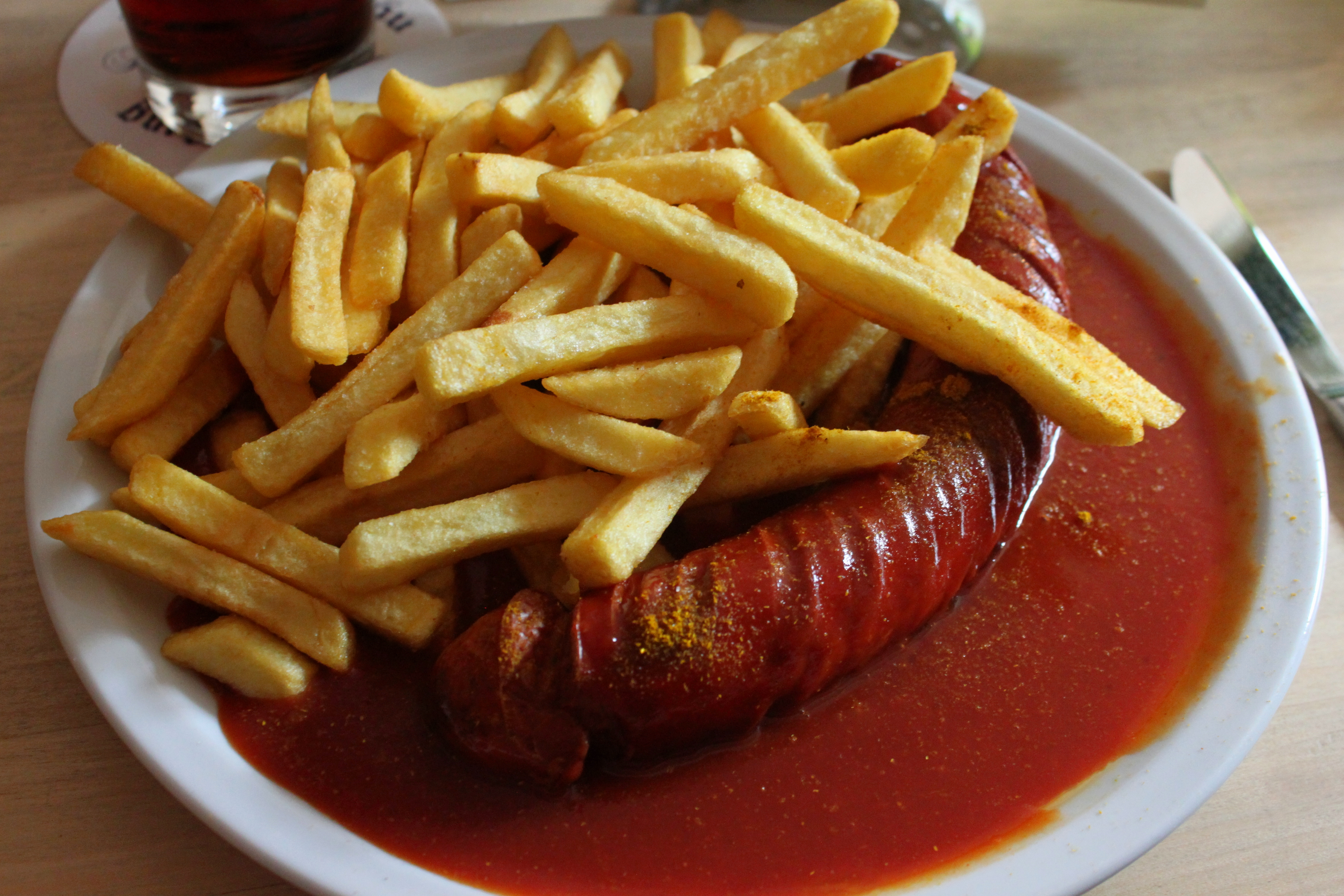
Currywurst and fries, Germany

French fries were introduced to German-speaking countries in the 19th century. In Germany, they are usually known by the French words pommes frites, or only Pommes or Fritten (derived from the French words, but pronounced as German words). Often served with ketchup or mayonnaise, they are popular as a side dish in restaurants, or as a street-food snack purchased at an Imbissstand (snack stand). Since the 1950s, currywurst has become a widely-popular dish that is commonly offered with fries. Currywurst is a sausage (often bratwurst or bockwurst) in a spiced ketchup-based sauce, dusted with curry powder and served with fries.

=== United Kingdom ===
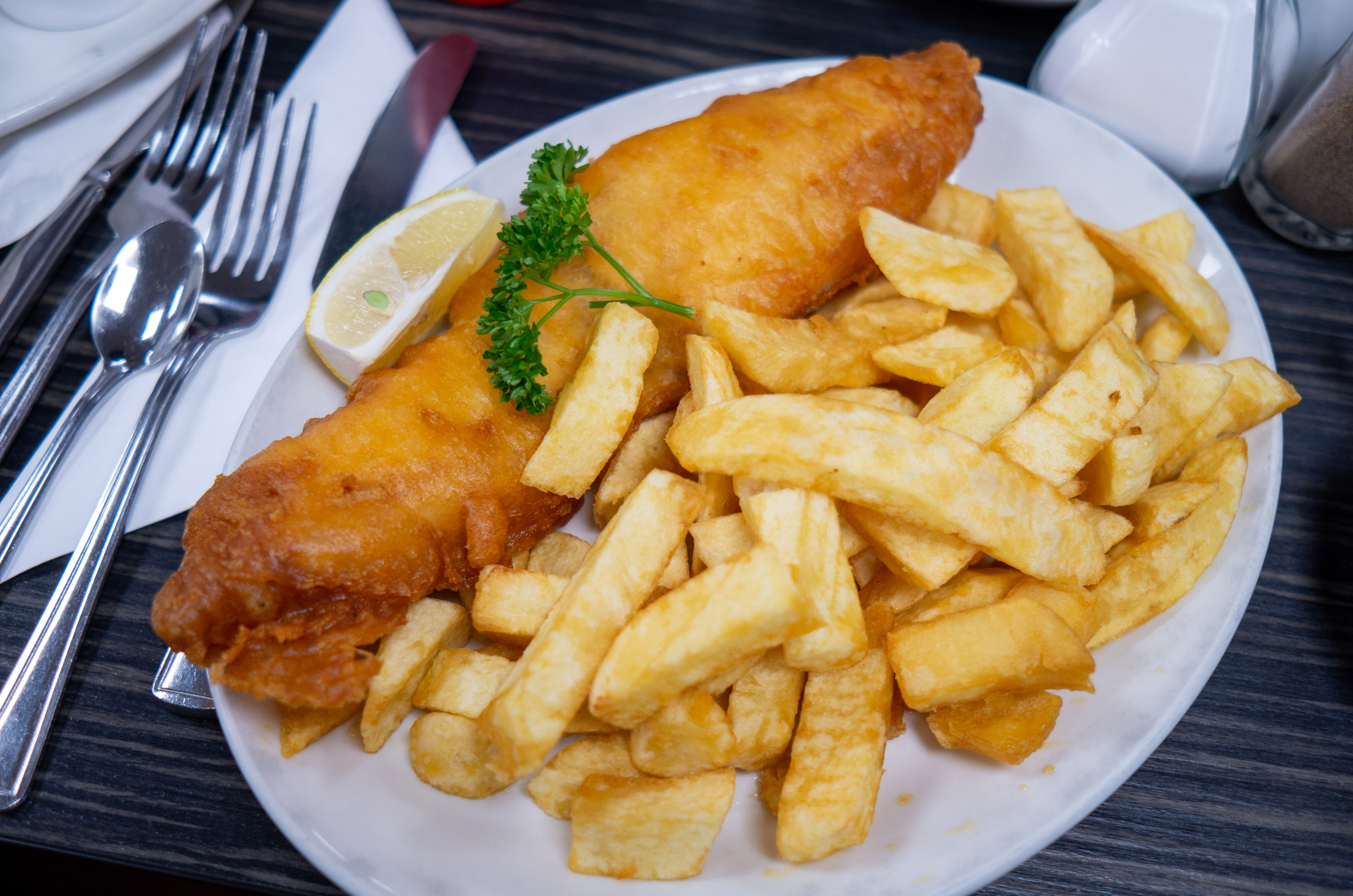
Fish and chips

The standard deep-fried cut potatoes in the United Kingdom are called chips, and are cut into pieces typically between 10 and 15 mm (0.4 and 0.6 in) thick. They are occasionally made from unpeeled potatoes (skins showing). British chips are not the same thing as potato chips (an American term); those are called "crisps" in the UK and some other countries. In the UK, chips are part of the popular, and now international, fast food dish fish and chips, as well as many other dishes. In the UK, "chips" are not the same as French fries: chips are more thickly cut than French fries, and they can be cooked once or multiple times at different temperatures. From 1813 on, recipes for deep-fried cut potatoes occur in popular cookbooks. By the late 1850s, at least one cookbook refers to "French Fried Potatoes".

The first commercially available chips in the UK were sold by Mrs 'Granny' Duce in one of the West Riding towns in 1854. A blue plaque in Oldham marks the origin of the fish-and-chip shop and the start of the fast food industry in Britain. In Scotland, chips were first sold in Dundee: "in the 1870s, that glory of British gastronomy – the chip – was first sold by Belgian immigrant Edward De Gernier in the city's Greenmarket". In Ireland the first chip shop was "opened by Giuseppe Cervi", an Italian immigrant, "who arrived there in the 1880s". It was estimated in 2011 that in the UK, 80% of households bought frozen chips each year. Although chips were a popular dish in most Commonwealth countries, the "thin style" French fries have been popularised worldwide in large part by the large American fast food chains such as McDonald's and Burger King.

=== Netherlands ===
"Pommes frites" or just "frites" (French), "frieten" (a word used in Flanders and the southern provinces of the Netherlands) or "patat" (used in the north and central parts of the Netherlands) became a national snack. Fries also come in the form of a common Dutch street food, known as Patatje Oorlog, translated to as "war fries". It consists of fries dressed with mayonnaise, a peanut-based satay sauce and garnished with diced raw onions along with a variety of other optional ingredients.

=== Canada ===
==== New Brunswick ====
The town of Florenceville-Bristol, New Brunswick in Canada, headquarters of McCain Foods, calls itself "the French fry capital of the world" and also hosts a museum about potatoes called Potato World. McCain Foods is the world's largest manufacturer of frozen French fries and other potato specialities. Canada is also responsible for providing 22% of China's French fries.

==== Quebec ====
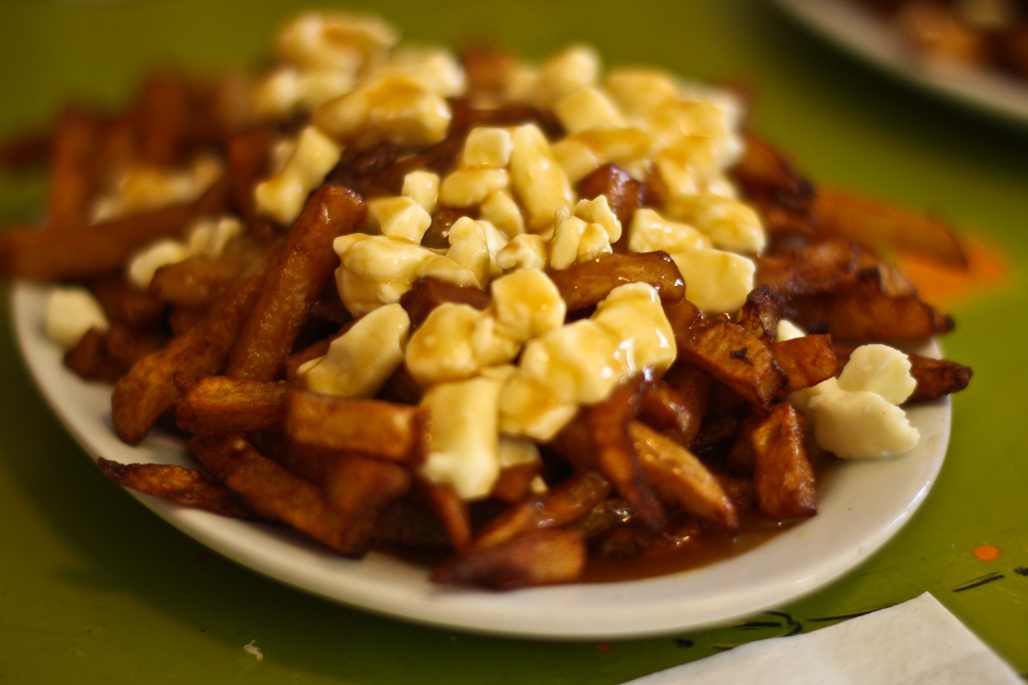
A popular Québécois dish is poutine, such as this one from La Banquise restaurant in Montreal. It is made with French fries, cheese curds and gravy.

French fries are the main ingredient in the Québécois dish known as poutine, a dish consisting of fried potatoes covered with cheese curds and brown gravy. Poutine has a growing number of variations, but it is generally considered to have been developed in rural Québec sometime in the 1950s, although precisely where in the province it first appeared is a matter of contention.

=== United States ===
In the United States, the J. R. Simplot Company is credited with successfully commercialising French fries in frozen form during the 1940s. Subsequently, in 1967, Ray Kroc of McDonald's contracted the Simplot company to supply them with frozen fries, replacing fresh-cut potatoes. In 2004, 29% of the United States' potato crop was used to make frozen fries; 90% consumed by the food services sector and 10% by retail. The United States supplies China with most of their French fries, as 70% of China's French fries are imported. Pre-made French fries have been available for home cooking since the 1960s, having been pre-fried (or sometimes baked), frozen and placed in a sealed plastic bag. Some fast-food chains dip the fries in a sugar solution or a starch batter, to alter the appearance or texture. French fries are one of the most popular dishes in the United States, commonly being served as a side dish to main dishes and in fast food restaurants. The average American eats around 30 pounds (14 kg) of French fries a year.

=== Spain ===
In Spain, fried potatoes are called patatas fritas or papas fritas. Another common form, involving larger irregular cuts, is patatas bravas. The potatoes are cut into big chunks, partially boiled and then fried. They are usually seasoned with a spicy tomato sauce. Fries are a common side dish in Latin American cuisine or part of larger preparations such as the salchipapas in Peru or chorrillana in Chile.

=== South Africa ===
Whilst eating 'regular' crispy French fries is common in South Africa, a regional favourite, particularly in Cape Town, is a soft soggy version doused in white vinegar called "slap-chips" (pronounced "slup-chips" in English or "slaptjips" in Afrikaans). These chips are typically thicker and fried at a lower temperature for a longer period of time than regular French fries. Slap-chips are an important component of a Gatsby sandwich, also a common Cape Town delicacy. Slap-chips are also commonly served with deep fried fish which are also served with the same white vinegar.

=== Japan ===
Fried potato (フライドポテト, Furaido poteto) is a standard fast-food side dish in Japan. Inspired by Japanese cuisine, okonomiyaki fries are served with a topping of unagi sauce, mayonnaise, katsuobushi, nori seasoning (furikake) and stir-fried cabbage.

== Variants ==
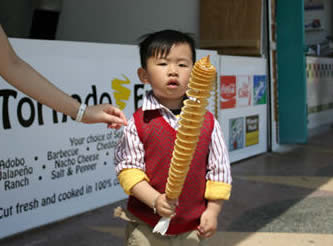
A child holding tornado fries

French fries come in multiple variations and toppings. Some examples include:

- Carne asada fries – fries covered with carne asada, guacamole, sour cream and cheese.
- Cheese fries – fries covered with cheese.
- Chilli cheese fries – fries covered with chilli and cheese.
- Chorrillana – fries topped with sliced meat, caramelised onion, and fried eggs.
- Cottage fries – thick, circular potato slices cut horizontally rather than vertically, pillowy and ridged, traditionally baked or fried until the edges are crispy and the centers remain soft.
- Curly fries – characterised by their helical shape, cut from whole potatoes using a specialised spiral slicer.
- Curry chips – fries covered in curry sauce.
- Dirty fries – fries covered in melted cheese with various toppings such as bacon, pulled pork, chilli or gravy.
- French fry sandwich – fried potato with bread, including the chip butty, horseshoe sandwich, french tacos, and the mitraillette.
- Greek fries – fries topped with feta cheese and various toppings such as tomatoes, red onions, and tzatziki.
- Kimchi fries – fries topped with caramelised baechu-kimchi and green onions
- Loaded fries – fries topped with cheese and bacon.
- Microwave fries – fries that are cooked in the microwave; some frozen fries have instructions for microwaving.
- Oven fries – fries that are cooked in the oven as a final step in the preparation.
- Potato wedges – thick-cut, elongated wedge-shaped fries with the skin left on.
- Poutine – a dish consisting of fries topped with cheese curds and gravy and principally associated with the Canadian province of Québec.
- Salt and pepper chips, 3-in-1 chips, and the Spice bag – various British Chinese fusion and Irish Chinese fusion dishes.
- Shoestring fries – thin-cut fries.
- Steak fries – thick-cut fries.
- Sweet potato fries – fries made with sweet potatoes instead of traditional white potatoes.
- Tornado fries – helical-cut potatoes that are placed on a skewer and then deep fried.
- Triple-cooked chips – fries that are simmered, cooled and drained using a low-temp-long-time (LTLT) cooking technique; they are then deep fried at just 130 °C, cooled and finally deep fried at 180 °C.
- Waffle fries – lattice-shaped fries obtained by quarter-turning the potato before each next slide over a grater and deep-frying just once.
- A baked variant, oven fries, uses less or no oil.
- Garlic fries, a variant that includes garlic and parsley.
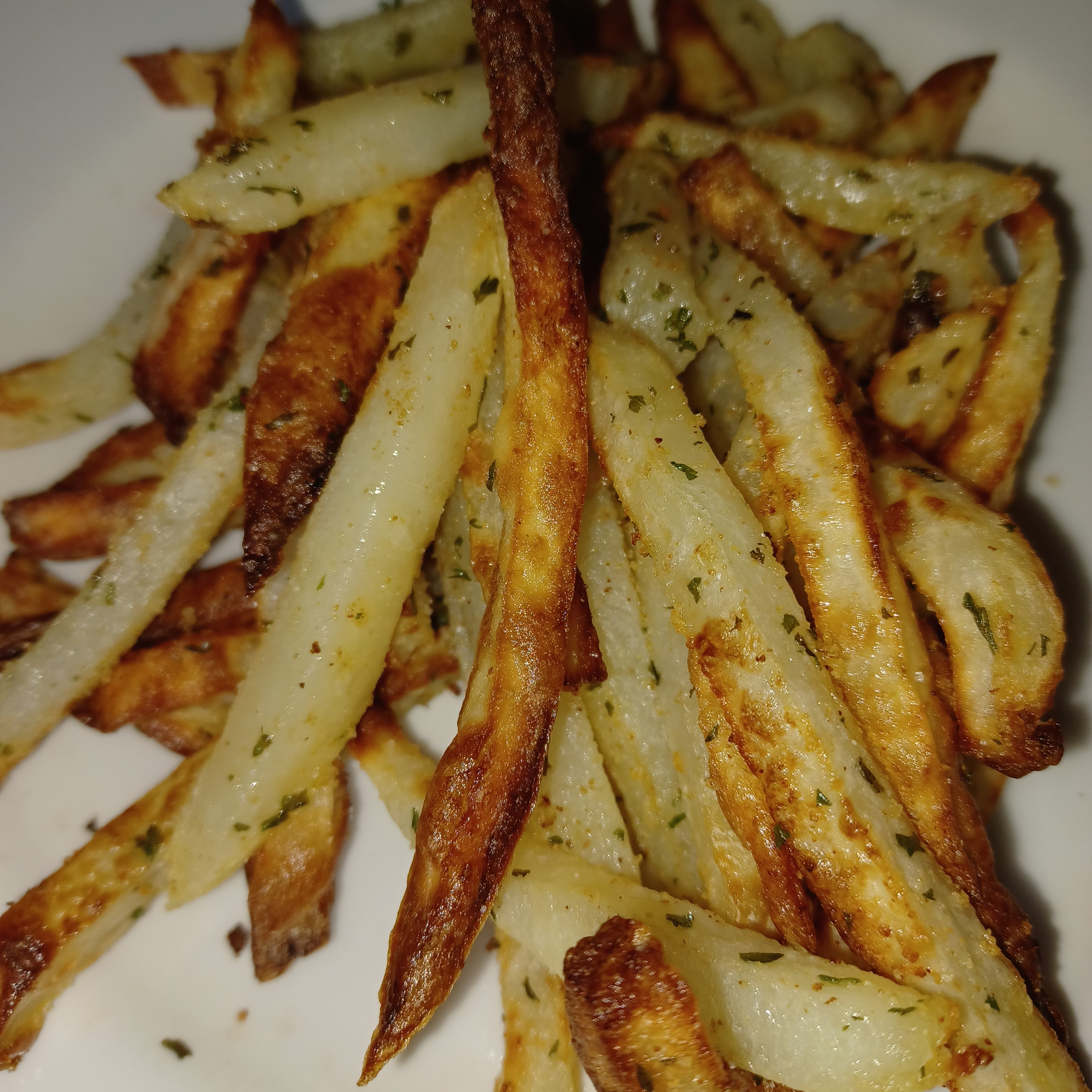
Air-fried fries

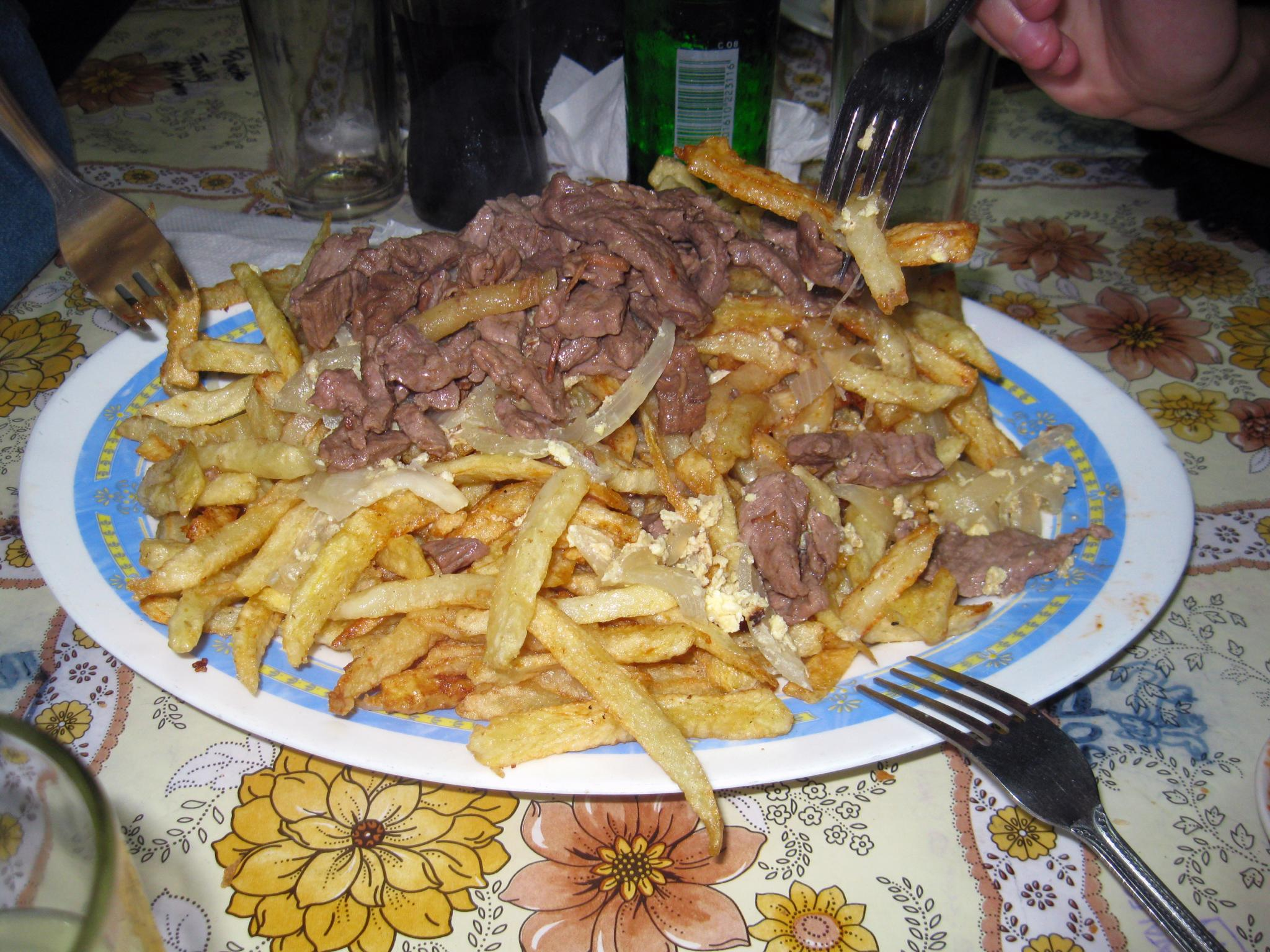
Chorrillana

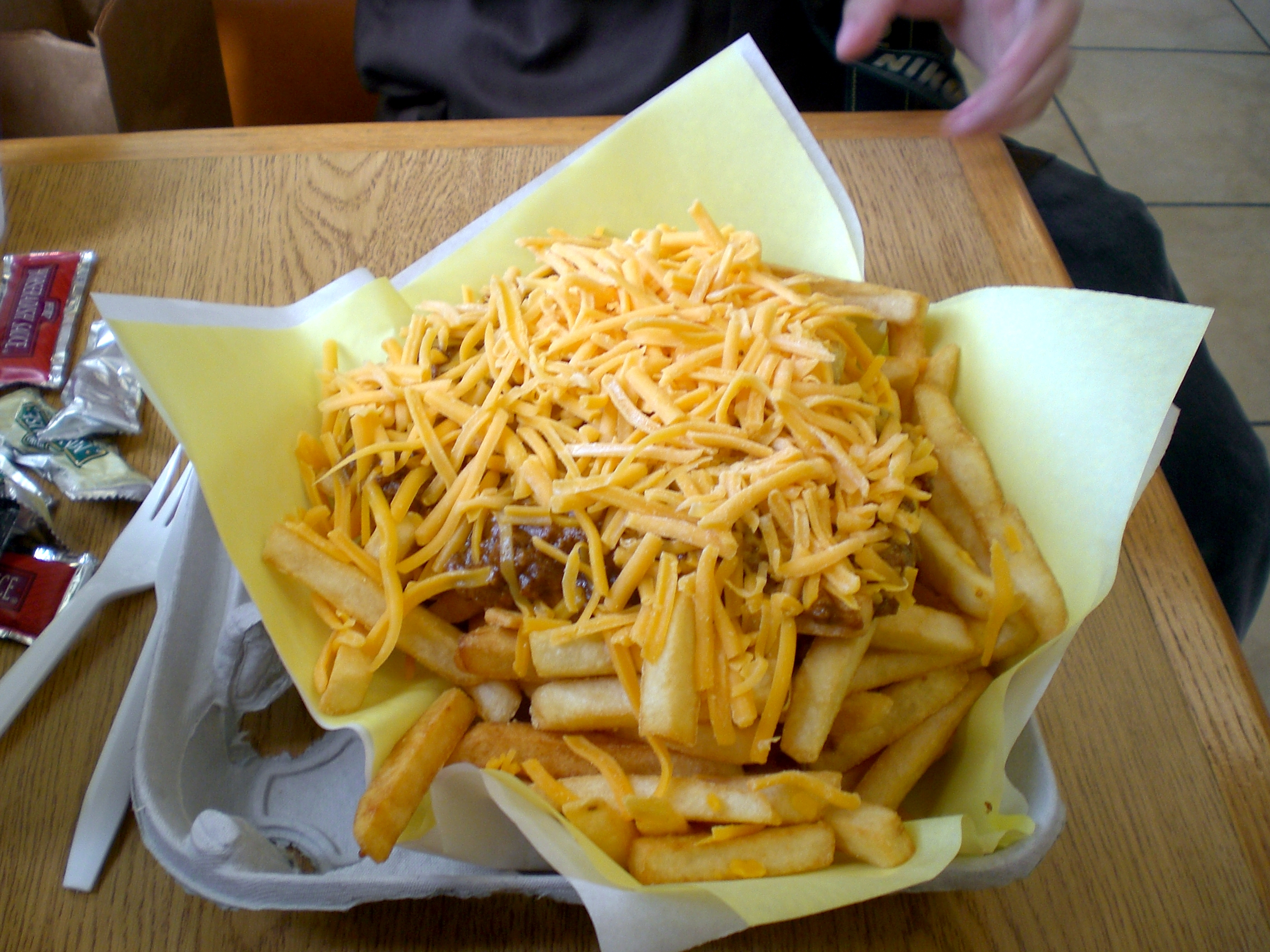
Chilli cheese fries

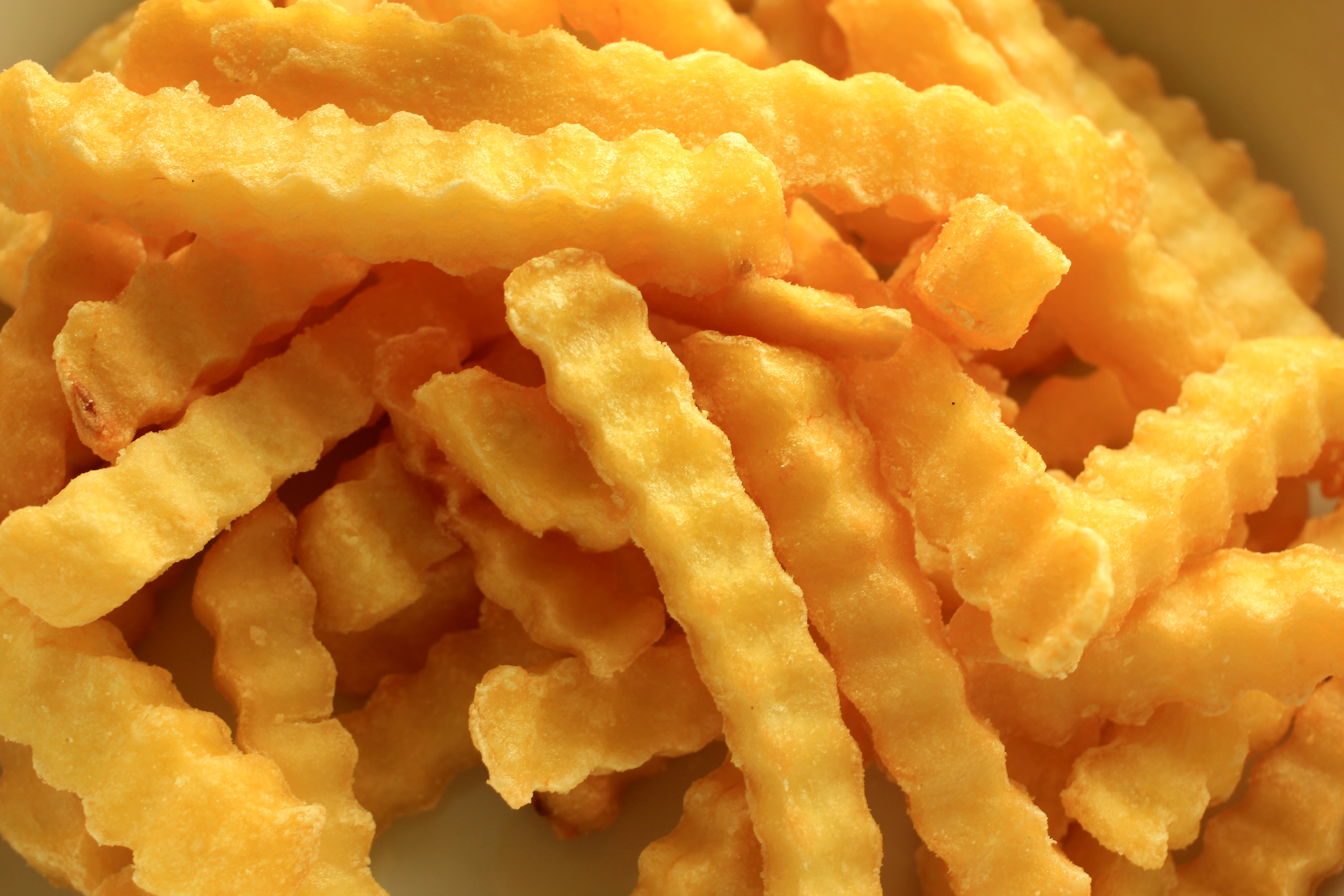
Crinkle-cut fries

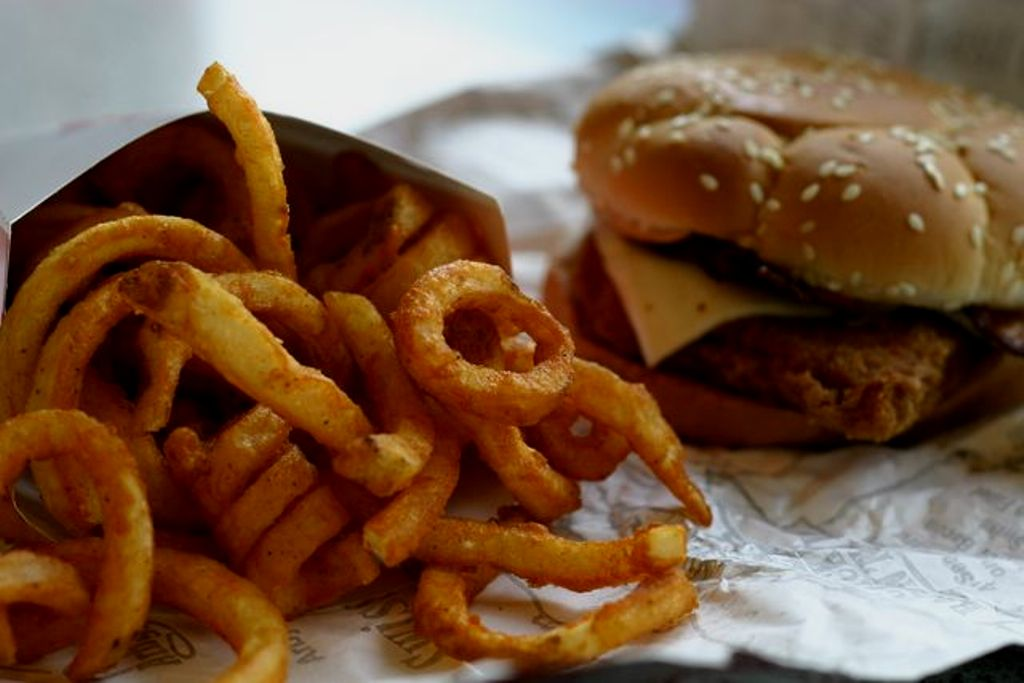
Curly fries

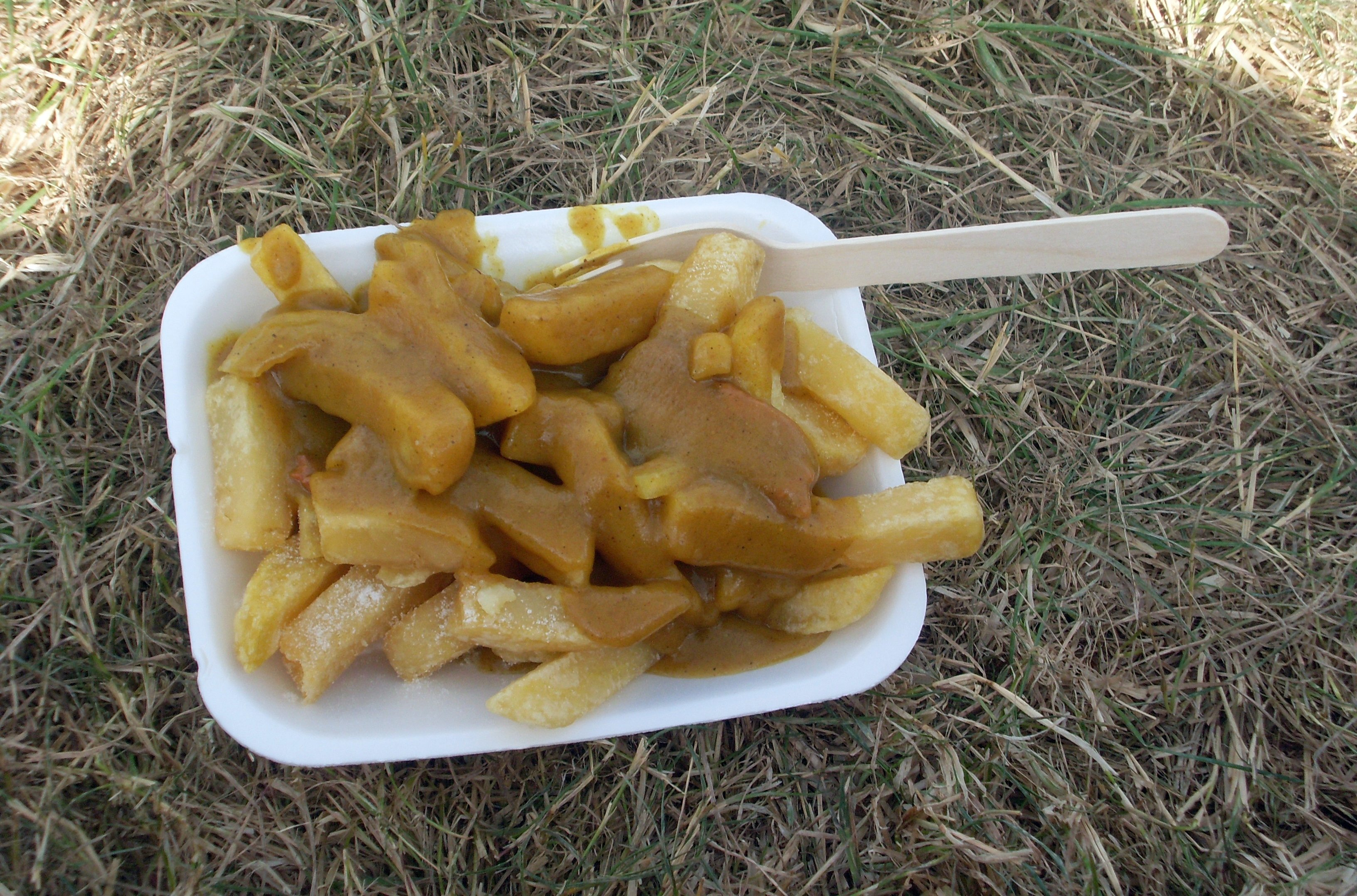
Curry chips

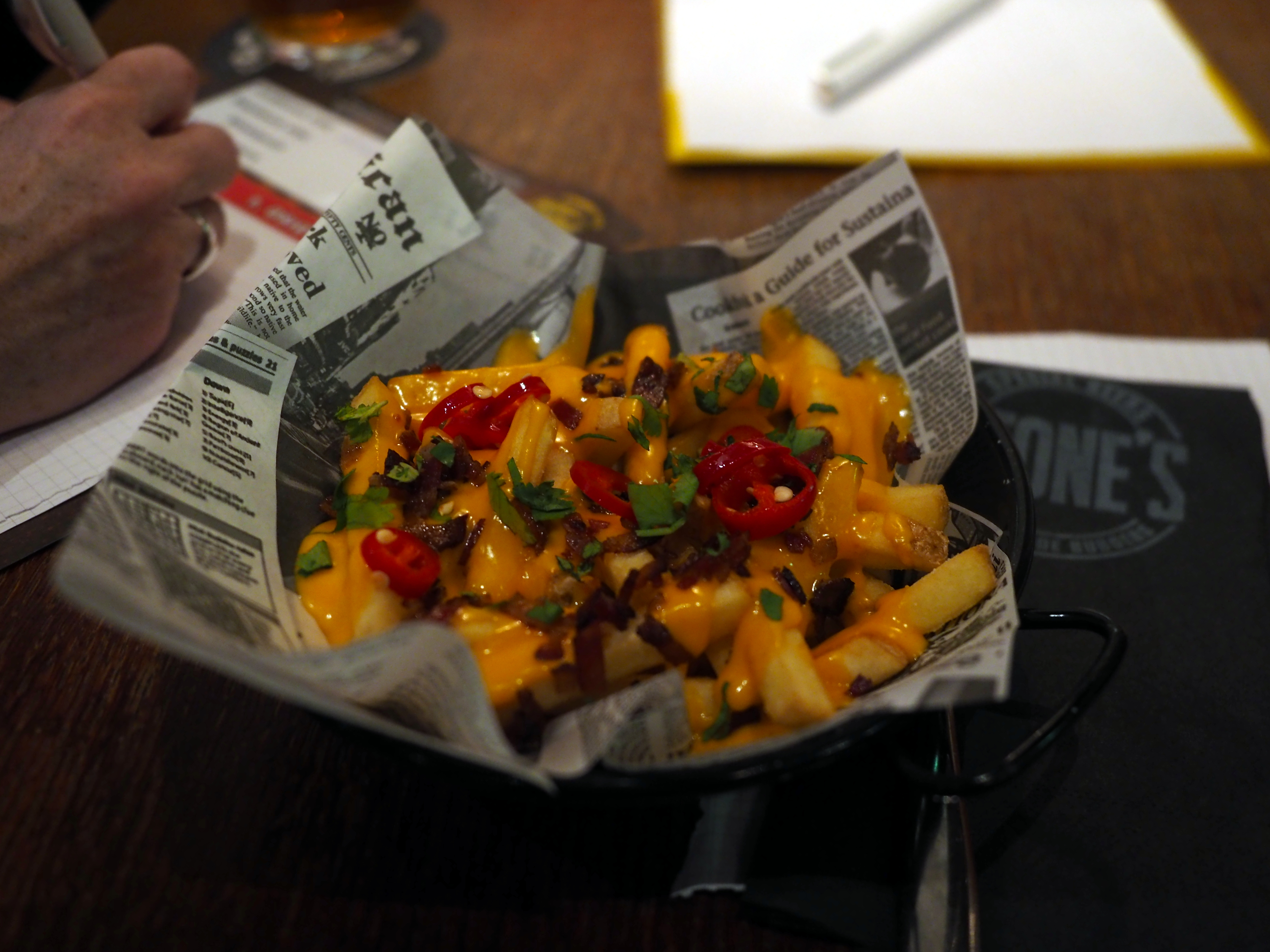
Dirty fries

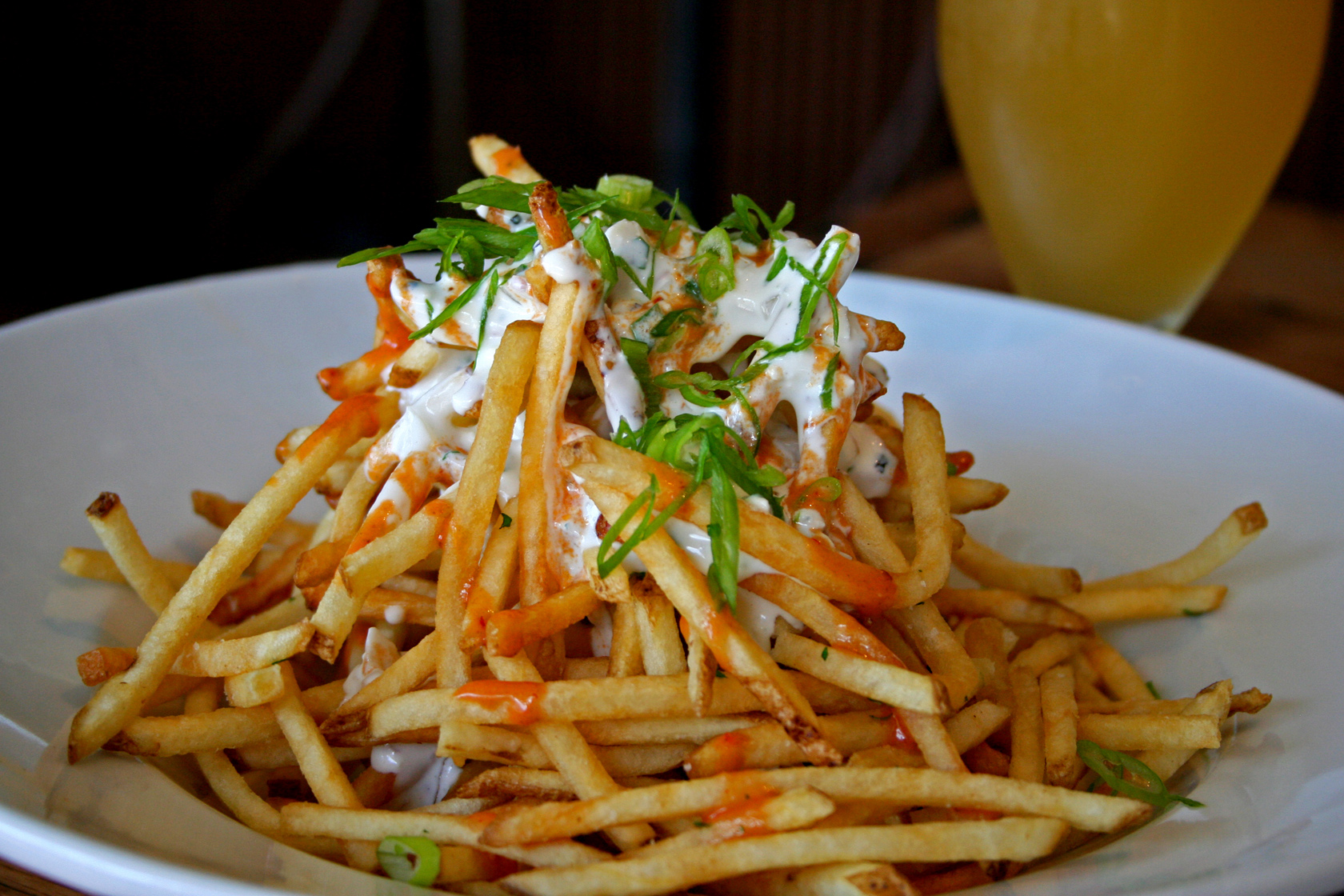
Shoestring fries with blue cheese dressing

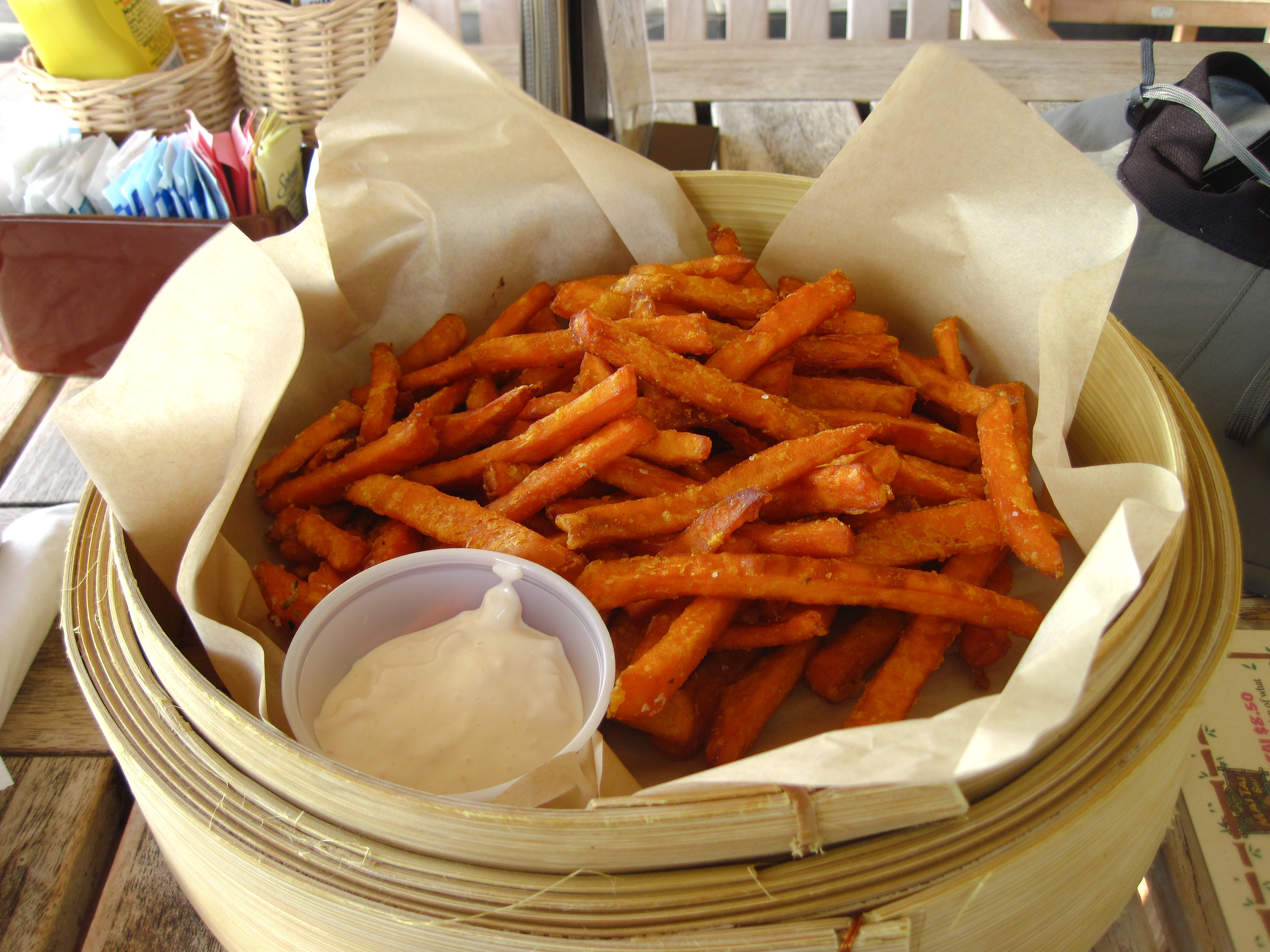
Sweet potato fries

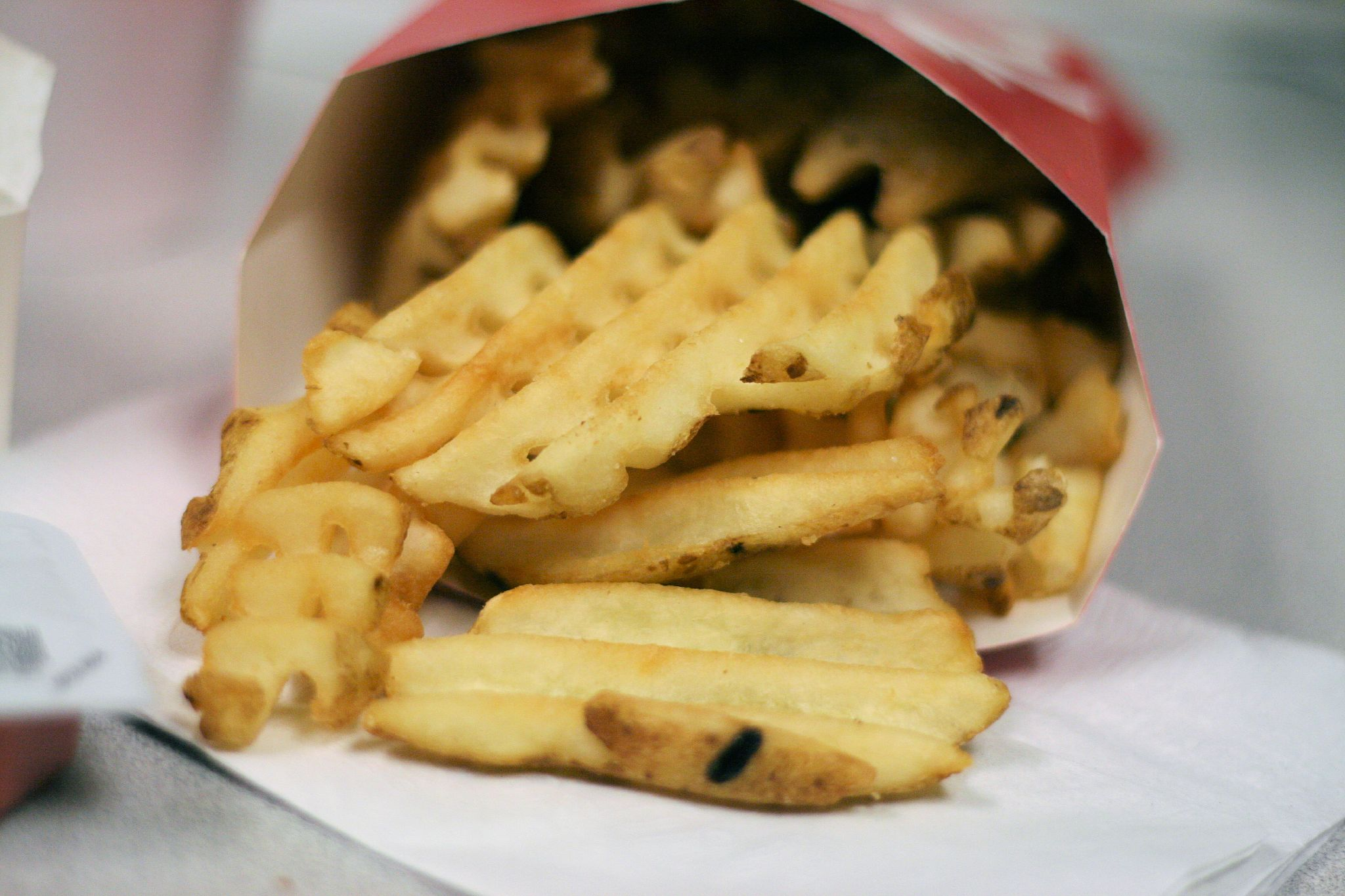
Waffle fries

== Accompaniments ==
Fries tend to be served with a variety of accompaniments, such as salt, vinegar (malt, balsamic or white), pepper, Cajun seasoning, grated cheese, melted cheese, mushy peas, heated curry sauce, curry ketchup, hot sauce, relish, mustard, mayonnaise, bearnaise sauce, tartar sauce, chilli, tzatziki, feta cheese, garlic sauce, fry sauce, butter, sour cream, ranch dressing, barbecue sauce, gravy, honey, aioli, brown sauce, ketchup, lemon juice, piccalilli, pickled cucumber, pickled gherkins, pickled onions or pickled eggs. In Australia, a popular flavouring added to chips is chicken salt.

== Nutrition ==
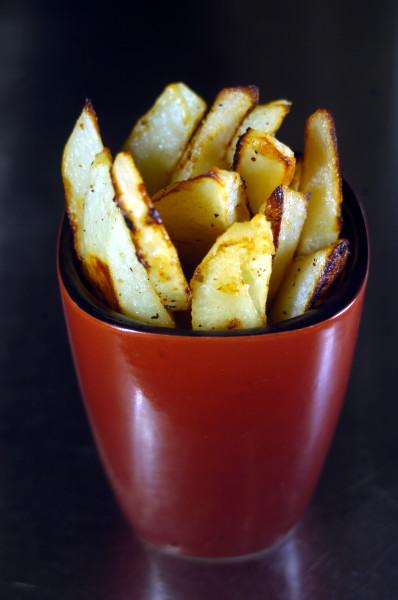
Oven-baked fries

French fries primarily contain carbohydrates (mostly in the form of starch), with some fat absorbed during the deep-frying process and protein from the potato. Salt, which contains sodium, is almost always applied as a surface seasoning. For example, a large serving of French fries at McDonald's in the United States is 154 grams and includes 350 mg of sodium. The 510 calories come from 66 g of carbohydrates, 24 g of fat and 7 g of protein.

A number of experts have criticised French fries for being very unhealthy. According to Jonathan Bonnet in a Time magazine article, "fries are nutritionally unrecognizable from a spud" because they "involve frying, salting, and removing one of the healthiest parts of the potato: the skin, where many of the nutrients and fiber are found." Kristin Kirkpatrick calls French fries "an extremely starchy vegetable dipped in a fryer that then loads on the unhealthy fat, and what you have left is a food that has no nutritional redeeming value in it at all." David Katz states that "French fries are often the super-fatty side dish to a burger—and both are often used as vehicles for things like sugar-laced ketchup and fatty mayo." Eric Morrissette, spokesperson for Health Canada, states that people should limit their intake of French fries, but eating them occasionally is not likely to be a health concern.

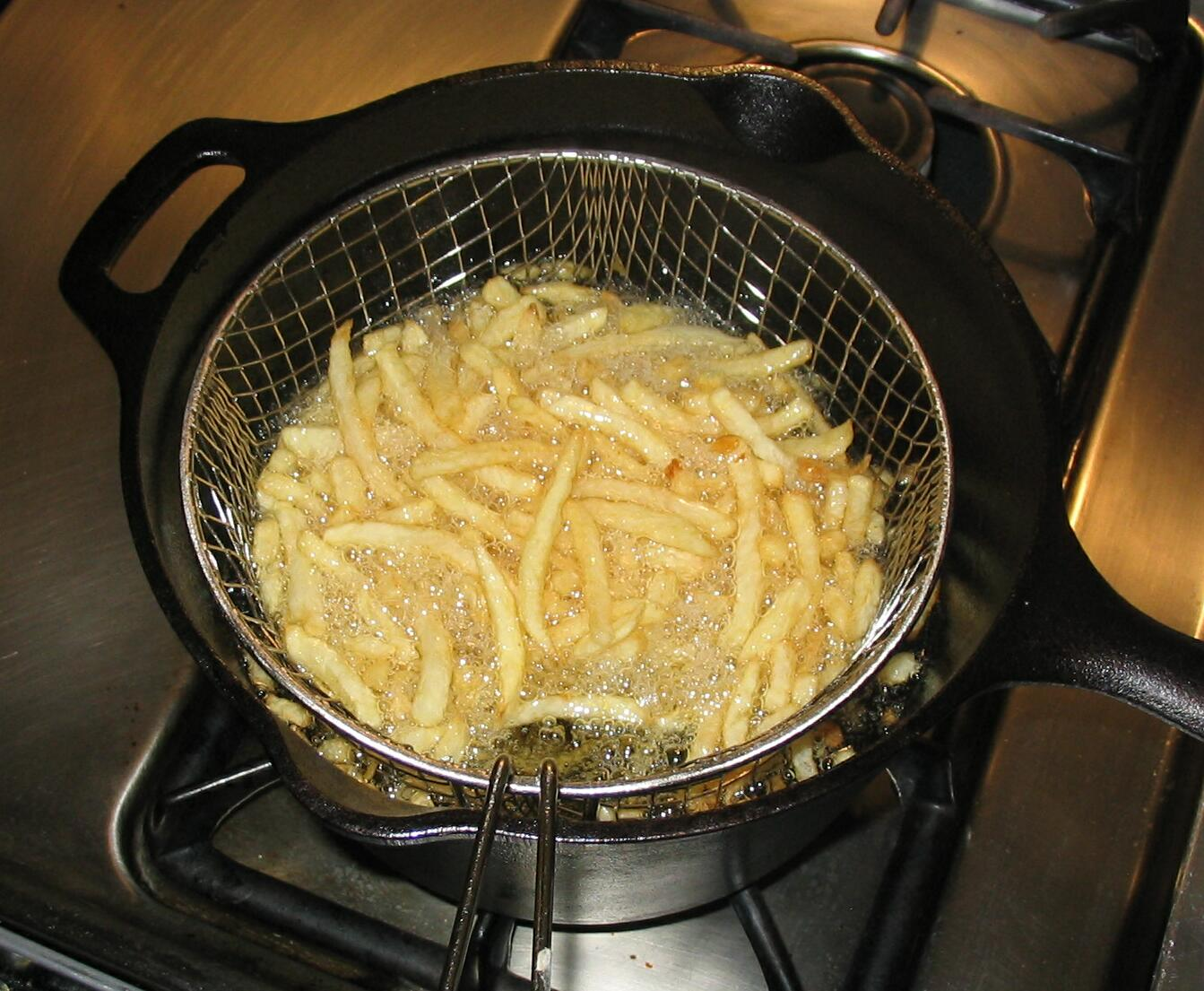
Fries frying in oil

Frying French fries in beef tallow, lard, or other animal fats adds saturated fat to them. Replacing animal fats with tropical vegetable oils, such as palm oil, simply substitutes one saturated fat for another. For many years partially hydrogenated vegetable oils were used as a means of avoiding cholesterol and reducing saturated fatty acid content, but in time the trans fat content of these oils was perceived as contributing to cardiovascular disease. Starting in 2008, many restaurant chains and manufacturers of pre-cooked frozen French fries for home reheating phased out trans-fat–containing vegetable oils.

French fries contain some of the highest levels of acrylamides of any foodstuff, and experts have raised concerns about the effects of acrylamides on human health. According to the American Cancer Society, it is not clear as of 2013 whether acrylamide consumption affects people's risk of getting cancer. A meta-analysis indicated that dietary acrylamide is not related to the risk of most common cancers, but could not exclude a modest association for kidney, endometrial or ovarian cancers. A lower-fat method for producing a French-fry–like product is to coat "Frenched" or wedge potatoes in oil and spices/flavouring before baking them. The temperature will be lower compared to deep frying, which reduces acrylamide formation.

In April 2023, researchers from China suggested a possible link between the consumption of fried food and mental health problems. According to the study, those who frequently consume fried food, especially potatoes, have an increased risk of depression and anxiety, by 7% and 12% respectively, compared to those who do not. The connection was particularly prominent among younger males. However, the causal relationship is not conclusive. The results are still preliminary, and the researchers are uncertain whether consuming fried foods causes mental health problems or individuals with symptoms of anxiety and depression tend to opt for fried foods.

== Legal issues ==
In June 2004, the United States Department of Agriculture (USDA), with the advisement of a federal district judge from Beaumont, Texas, classified batter-coated French fries as a vegetable under the Perishable Agricultural Commodities Act. This was primarily for trade reasons; French fries do not meet the standard to be listed as a processed food. This classification, referred to as the "French fry rule", was upheld in the United States Court of Appeals for the Fifth Circuit case Fleming Companies, Inc. v. USDA.

== Environmental impact ==
A 2022 study estimated the environmental impact of 57,000 food products in the UK and Ireland, finding that French fries had a lower impact on the environment than many other foods.

== See also ==
- Avocado fries – Dish made with avocado
- Freedom fries – Politically motivated euphemism for French fries
- Smiley fries – Deep-fried circular potato made into smiley faces
- French fry vending machine – Vending machine that dispenses hot French fries
- German fries – Thinly sliced raw or cooked potatoes fried in fat
- List of deep fried foods
- Mitraillette – Belgian sandwich
- Pommes dauphine – Potato dish
- Pommes duchesse
- Pommes soufflées – Fried potato dish
- Potato wedges – Slices of a potato, baked or fried

== Bibliography ==
- Lingle, Blake (2016). Fries!: An Illustrated Guide to the World's Favorite Food. New York: Princeton Architectural Press. ISBN 978-1-61689-458-0.
- Tebben, Maryann (2006). "French Fries: France's Culinary Identity from Brillat-Savarin to Barthes (essay)". Convivium Artium. University of Texas at San Antonio. Archived from the original on 5 May 2014.
