= Chorrillana =

Chilean dish

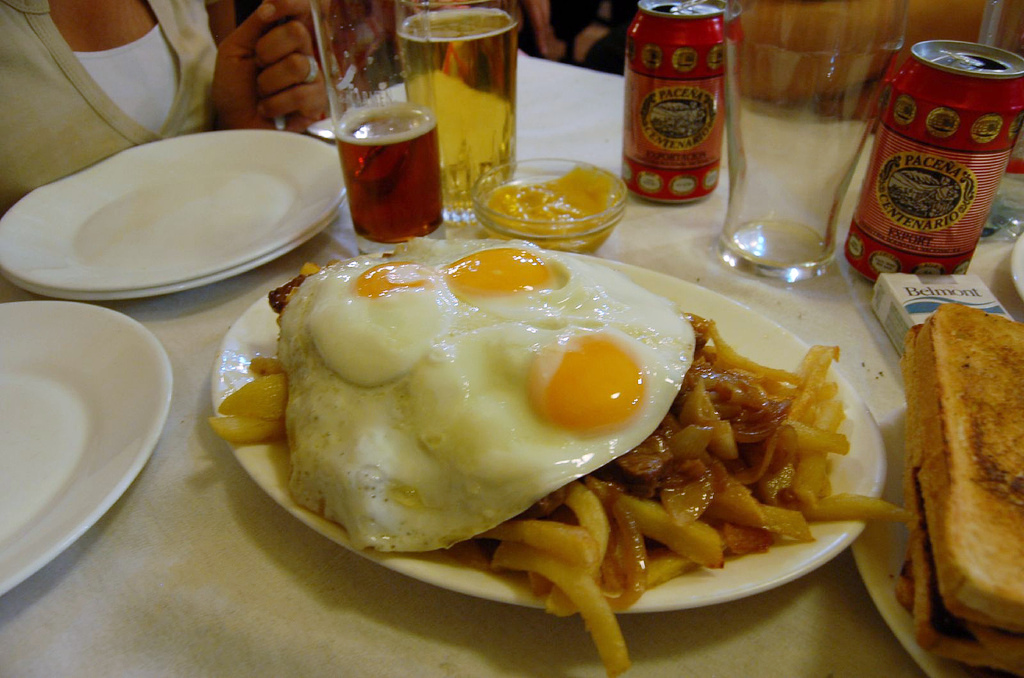
- Chorrillana
- Place of origin: Chile
- Main ingredients: French fries, meat, onion, fried eggs, salt, cheese and other spices

Chorrillana is a Chilean dish consisting of a plate of salted French fries topped with different types of sliced meat, sausages and other ingredients, most commonly scrambled or fried eggs, and caramelized onions. It is commonly served as a comfort food in bars.

Because of its large size, it is usually served as a dish to share. There are several recipes for the chorrillana, depending on the restaurant and the chef. The base of beef and fries is the only constant. Traditional recipes mix scrambled egg, fried onion and sliced beef. Some preparations may use chopped frankfurter sausages, chorizo, tomatoes and seasonings such as garlic or oregano.

This dish is similar to the Québécois dish poutine and the Peruvian classic street food salchipapa.

== See also ==
- Chilean cuisine
- List of beef dishes
- List of meat and potato dishes
- Steak and eggs
