= Old South (orange juice) =

Brand of frozen concentrated orange juice

Old South is the name of a brand of frozen concentrated orange juice (FCOJ) sold in Canada since 1939. It produces a number of different kinds of orange juice, as well as other fruit juices. The brand was formerly owned by the Pasco Beverage Company, a citrus growers' cooperative, and was bought by Louis Dreyfus Citrus, the third largest orange juice producer in the world, which is owned by the Louis Dreyfus Group.

McCain Foods Ltd. purchased the Old South Brand in 2000 in exchange for selling its citrus operation in the United States. Old South is the third-largest selling frozen juice concentrate brand in Canada.

McCain Foods (Canada) has sold its frozen beverage business in 2013 to Louis Dreyfus Canada, part of the Louis Dreyfus Commodities Group.
