= Smiley fries =

Deep-fried circular potato made into smiley faces

- Smiley fries on a plate
- Alternative names: Smiles (from McCain Foods), Potato smiles
- Type: French fries
- Place of origin: Florenceville, New Brunswick, Canada
- Created by: McCain Foods
- Main ingredients: Potato

Smiley fries, also sold as McCain Smiles, are a food product consisting of fried potatoes in the shape of a smiley face.

== Overview ==
Smiley fries are made from mashed potatoes combined with potato flakes and other ingredients, which are molded into a smiley face shape. The manufacturing process is highly automated and involves several stages, including par-frying and individual quick freezing.

== History ==
McCain Foods invented smiley fries in the 1970s to reduce the potato waste generated by French fry production. They later became a common item in school cafeterias.

McCain Smiles were discontinued in Australia in 2015 due to poor sales, but returned to stores in 2020 following public demand.
