= Tornado potato =

South Korean street food

Tornado potatoes
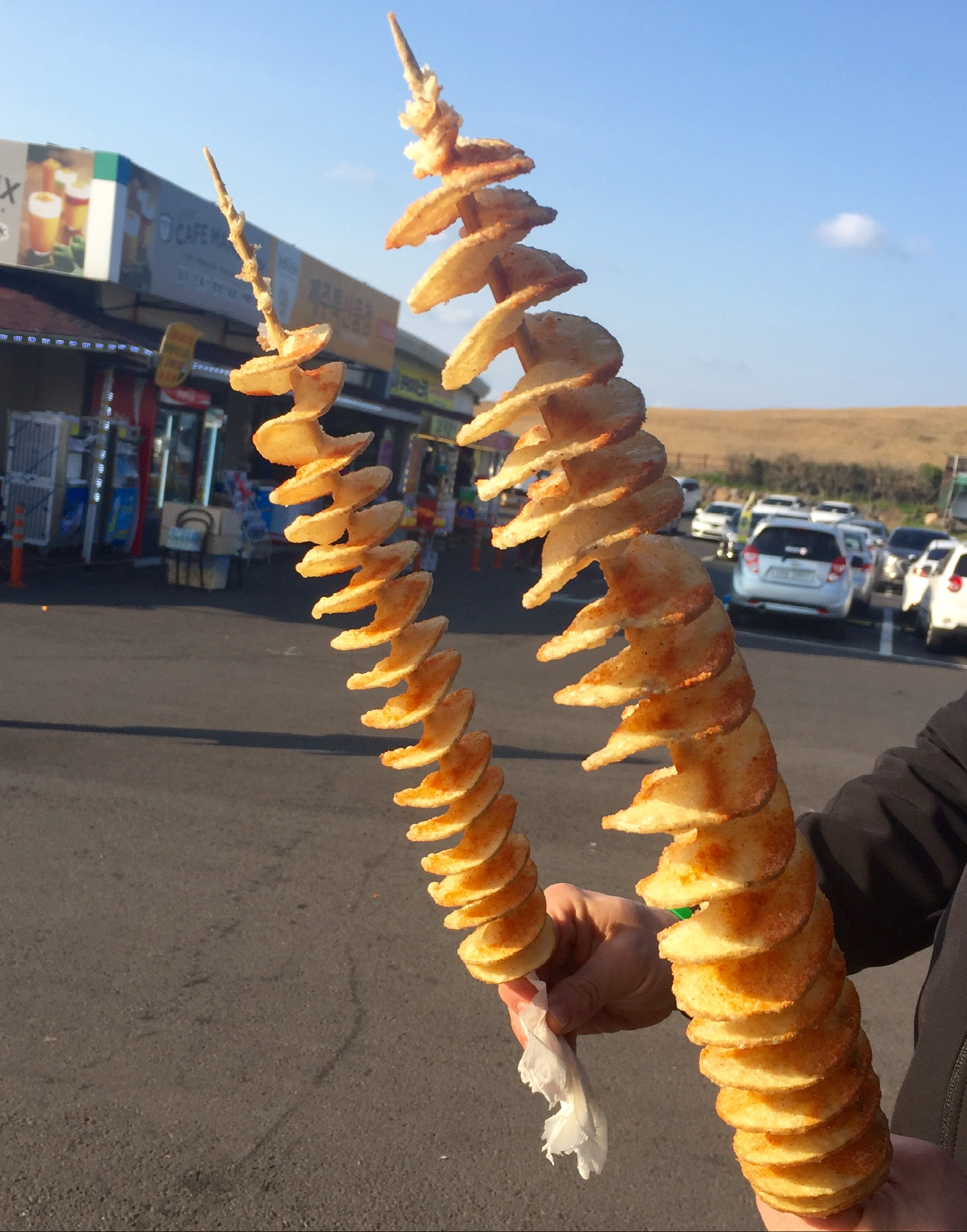
- Alternative names: Twist(ed) potatoes, tornado fries
- Place of origin: South Korea
- Associated cuisine: Korean cuisine
- Created by: Jeong Eun-suk
- Main ingredients: Potatoes, cooking oil

Korean name
- Hangul: 회오리감자
- RR: hoeorigamja
- MR: hoeorigamja
- IPA: [hwe.o.ɾi.ɡam.dʑa]

Tornado potatoes (Korean: 회오리감자)—also called rotato potato, spring potato, twist potatoes, potato twisters, potato swirl, spiral potato, potato on a stick, tornado fries, or chips on a stick (in Australia)—are a popular street food in South Korea, and many other countries. It is a deep fried spiral-cut whole potato on a skewer, similar to a French fry, brushed with various seasonings such as onion, cheese, or honey. Some varieties have spliced sausages in between.

== By country ==
=== Australia ===
In Australia, tornado potatoes are known as "chips on a stick", as "chips" refers to both fries and crisps in Australian English. They are popular at several events, including agricultural shows and carnivals, such as the Sydney Royal Easter Show.

Cyprus

In Cyprus, tornado potatoes come by different names, such as "swirl potato" (Στριφτή Πατάτα), "spiral potato" (Στριφογυριστή Πατάτα), and even as the "stick" itself in more rural areas (Ξυλούιν). It is a staple of Cypriot festivals culture, particularly in the southeast, the Kokkinochória, a region associated with iron-rich terra rossa red soil and of potato agricultural production and exports. Various associations and private street vendors provide them in cultural/gastronomical events, such as the Pancyprian Potato Festival in Avgorou, Famagusta. Introduced in the late 2010s, they are popularly eaten with sweet paprika, oregano, ketchup, mayonnaisse, and mustard, especially by children.

=== Mexico ===
In Mexico or places in the U.S. that are predominantly Mexican, these are known as "Espiropapas", which translates to "spiral potato". They can usually be found in places like flea markets and are typically served with ketchup. These were first created in 1997 by Mr Marco Antonio de Avila Espinoza in Guadalajara, Jalisco, and this could be the first appearance of the tornado potato.

== See also ==
- French fries
- Potato chip
