= Peter J. Taggares =

American businessman

- Born: 1932; Othello, Washington
- Died: 1999 (aged 66–67); Othello, Washington
- Education: attended Washington State University on a football scholarship but only completed his freshman year.
- Occupation: Farmer
- Known for: Founder of Chef Reddy Corp.

Peter J. Taggares was one of the wealthiest and most influential farmers in Washington state. At his death, his holdings included the largest irrigated potato farm in Oregon and one of the world's largest vineyards. He was also involved in politics, having contributed to numerous candidates from both major US political parties.

== Life ==
Taggares' father, Peter Taggares (Tagaris), emigrated from Greece at the age of 18. He traveled across the United States, eventually settling in Prosser, Washington, where he farmed and raised his family.

Taggares quit school after the third grade. In 1956, he established a small farm near Othello, Washington. From that beginning he built an agricultural empire in the Pacific Northwest second only to that of JR Simplot. At his death his holdings, estimated to be worth half a billion dollars, included the largest irrigated farm in Oregon and one of the world's largest vineyards. Chef Reddy Corp., which he founded in 1964, became one of the nation's largest producers of French fries.

On his farm every piece of equipment was painted white. This extended from his tractors, potato diggers, and potato trucks to his corporate jet, Mercedes, Cadillacs and yacht. On his 3,500-acre (14 km^{2}) farm in Othello, Washington, even the telephone poles are white.

== Involvement in politics ==
Although Taggares maintained a low profile outside of the agricultural community, he was frequently involved in politics and was frustrated by the government's inability to make decisions. He was a campaign contributor. In 1997 he was fined $52,500 (the largest such fine in Washington State history) for illegally contributing money to political candidates, much of it in the names of his employees.

== Commodities trading ==
In the mid-1970s, Taggares and his competitor, J. R. Simplot, were involved in the largest default in the history of American commodities futures trading. The incident, which led to a fine and temporary suspension from futures trading, nearly destroyed the New York Mercantile Exchange.
