= Greenyard Foods =

Produce processing and distribution company

Greenyard
- Type: Private company
- ISIN: BE0003765790
- Industry: Fruits and vegetables
- Founded: 2015; 11 years ago
- Headquarters: Sint-Katelijne-Waver (Antwerp Province), Belgium
- Key people: Francis Kint (CEO)
- Revenue: €4.176 billion (2018)
- Net income: €3.4 million (2018)
- Number of employees: Approximately 9,000 (2018)
- Website: www.greenyard.group/en

Greenyard is a Belgian produce processing and distribution company headquartered in Antwerp Province that focuses on fresh, frozen and prepared fruit and vegetables, flowers, and plants.

It was established in 2015 through the merger of four companies: Univeg (fresh fruits and vegetables, flowers, and plants), Pinguin (frozen foods), Noliko (canned fruits and vegetables), and Peltracom (horticultural substrates).

== History ==
The group has its origins in the company Weduwe M.Dejonghe & Zonen, which traded agricultural produce, mainly carrots. In 1965, a freezing plant was built in Westrozebeke, which became the starting point for the company that was later named Pinguin in 1968.

After continuous growth, the company went public in 1999. Subsequently, a series of acquisitions marked its external growth, including the acquisition of Lutosa in 2007, the merger with Noliko in 2011, and the acquisition of several plants from the CECAB Group in 2013, which were previously leased.

Univeg was founded by mushroom producer Hein Deprez in 1987. This distribution company experienced rapid growth and became a global supplier of fruits, vegetables, flowers, and plants through external acquisitions such as Bakker Barendrecht in the Netherlands, Katopé in France, Atlanta AG (the German branch of Chiquita), the Bocchi group in Italy, and Alara in Turkey.

Pinguin was renamed Greenyard Foods in 2013 and merged with Univeg and Peltracom in 2015.

The possibility of acquiring Dole Food Company was discussed in December 2017. However, on January 5, 2018, the negotiations were definitively abandoned.

== See also ==
- Bonduelle
