= Spiral vegetable slicer =

Kitchen appliance used for cutting vegetables

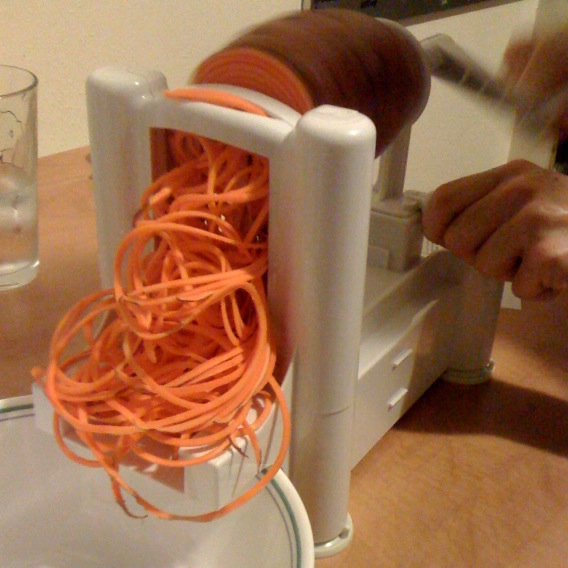
A table-top spiral vegetable slicer in use

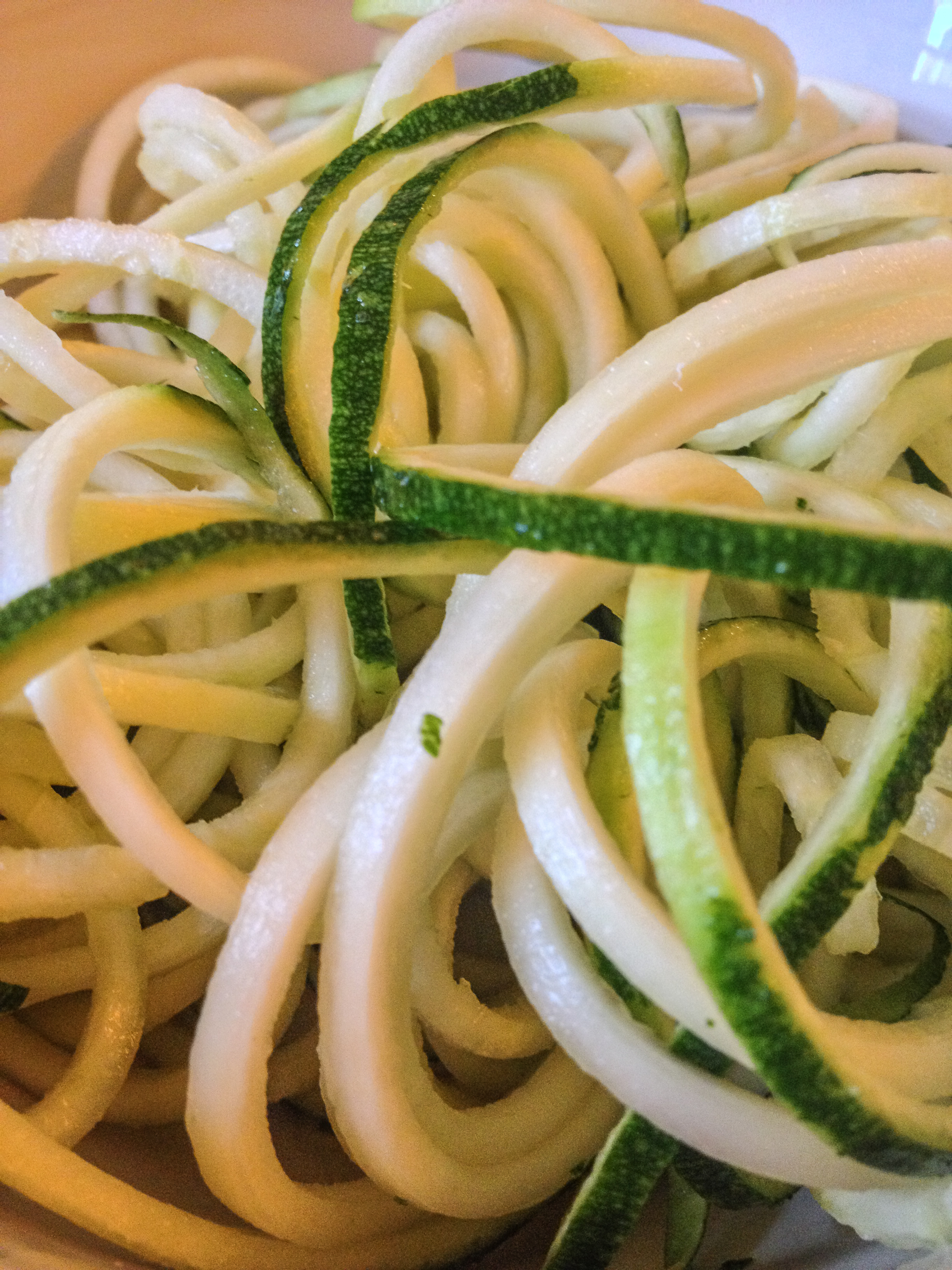
Zucchini noodles prepared with a spiral slicer

Spiral vegetable slicers (also known as spiralizers) are kitchen appliances used for cutting vegetables, such as zucchinis (to make zoodles), potatoes, cucumbers, carrots, apples, parsnips, and beetroots, into linguine-like strands which can be used as an alternative to pasta.

== Description ==
Spiral vegetable slicers are kitchen appliances used for cutting vegetables into linguine-like strands. Vegetables that they can be used with include zucchinis, potatoes, cucumbers, carrots, apples, parsnips, and beetroots. The strands can be used as an alternative to pasta, such as when using zucchinis to make zoodles. They can be fried to create spiral fries.

== Popularity ==
According to Good Housekeeping and US News, spiralizers were a hot trending item as of September 2014. The LA Times stated that spiralizers became popular in the spring of 2014. Spiralizers are especially popular among people following the Paleo diet, other low-carb diets, and raw vegans.

== Functionality ==
Spiralizers usually contain three blades: a round blade for spaghetti, a small flat blade for ribbons, and a large wide blade for spiral strands. Vegetables are clamped between the blade and crank. As the handle turns with a bit of pressure, the vegetable is pressed between the turning handle and the blade, which cuts it into spirals.

== See also ==
- Meat slicer
