= Halal snack pack =

Australian halal dish

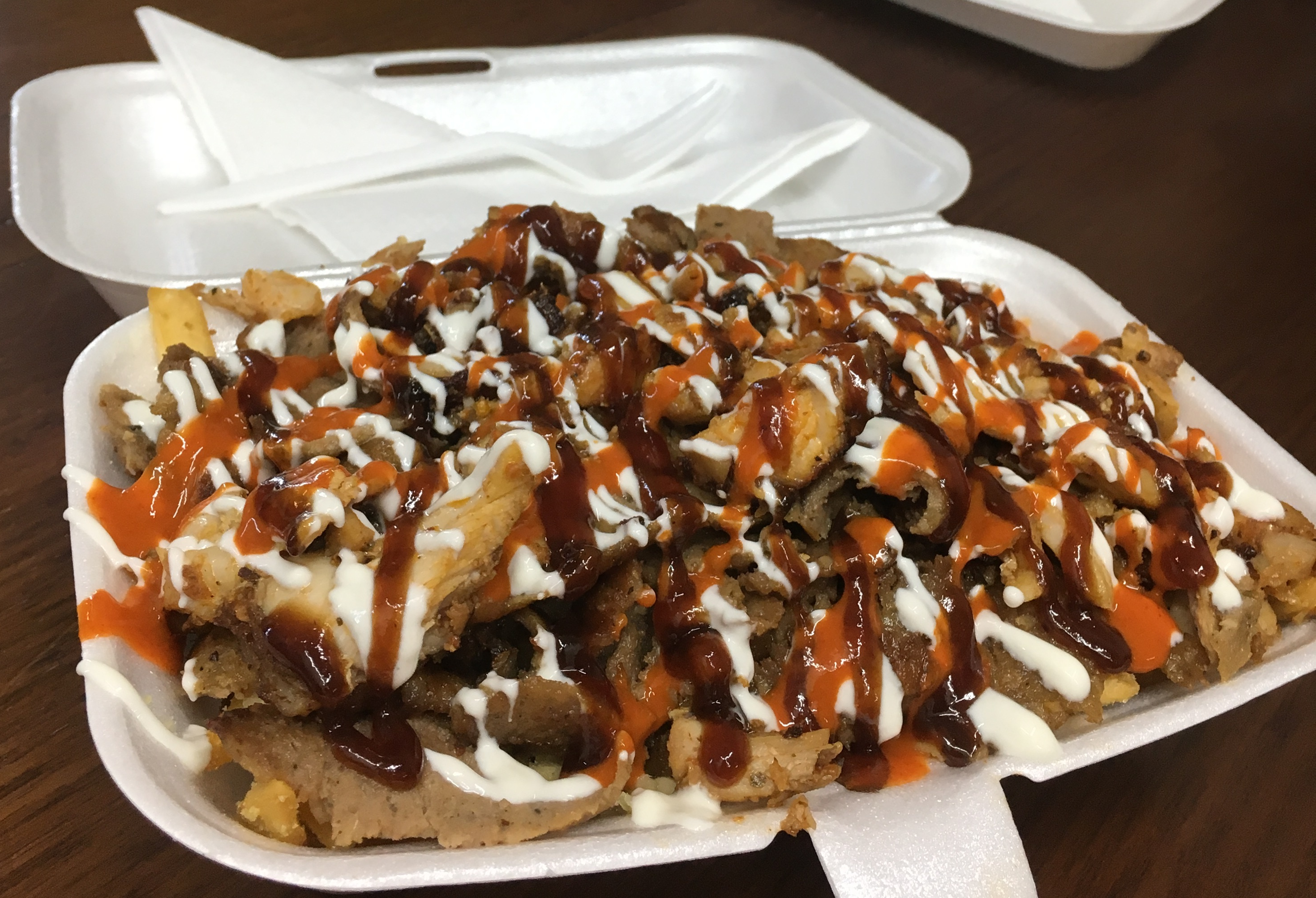
- A halal snack pack
- Alternative names: HSP; AB; meat in a box; meat on chips; meat box; snack box; snack pack; kebab snack plate; mixed meat package; kebab box
- Course: Main
- Place of origin: Australia
- Region or state: Australasia
- Associated cuisine: Australian cuisine
- Serving temperature: Hot
- Main ingredients: Doner kebab; chips; sauces; cheese (optional)

A halal snack pack is an Australian fast food dish consisting of halal-certified doner kebab meat (lamb, chicken, beef, or a combination) and chips. It also includes different kinds of sauces, usually chilli, garlic, and barbecue (sometimes known as the "holy trinity"). Yoghurt or yoghurt sauce, cheese, jalapeño peppers, and tabbouleh are also common additions. While the snack pack was traditionally served in a polystyrene container, it is now most commonly served in moulded pulp or cardboard containers, as most Australian states have banned single-use plastic packaging. The snack pack has been described as a staple takeaway dish of kebab shops in Australia.

Some Australian restaurant menus refer to the dish as a "snack pack", "snack box" or "mixed plate". The name of the dish was voted by readers of the Macquarie Dictionary as the "People's Choice Word of the Year" for 2016. In Western Australia, the dish is often called a "meat box", and in Adelaide it is known as an "AB". (Note: The name supposedly stands for "abortion", but other variants include "after birth", "absolutely beautiful" or "atomic bomb".) The dish also exists in New Zealand, where it is known as meat on chips. A similar food is the Dutch kapsalon.

== History ==
According to some, snack packs date back at least to the 1980s. They have since become a quintessential Australian dish. Variations or similar dishes exist in other countries; examples include "doner meat and chips" in the United Kingdom, "kebab meat on chips" in New Zealand, "Döner-Box" in Germany, "kapsalon" ("barbershop") in the Netherlands and Belgium, "kebabtallrik" ("kebab plate") in Sweden, "gyro fries" in the United States, and "kebab ranskalaisilla" ("kebab with French fries") in Finland.

In late 2015, following the creation of the Facebook group Halal Snack Pack Appreciation Society, a subculture formed around the dish that was known to bring cultures together. This led to wide coverage of the dish in the media, as well as a notable reference by Senator Sam Dastyari in Australian Parliament during a debate about halal certification which is credited for much of the increase in attention paid to this dish.

== In popular culture ==
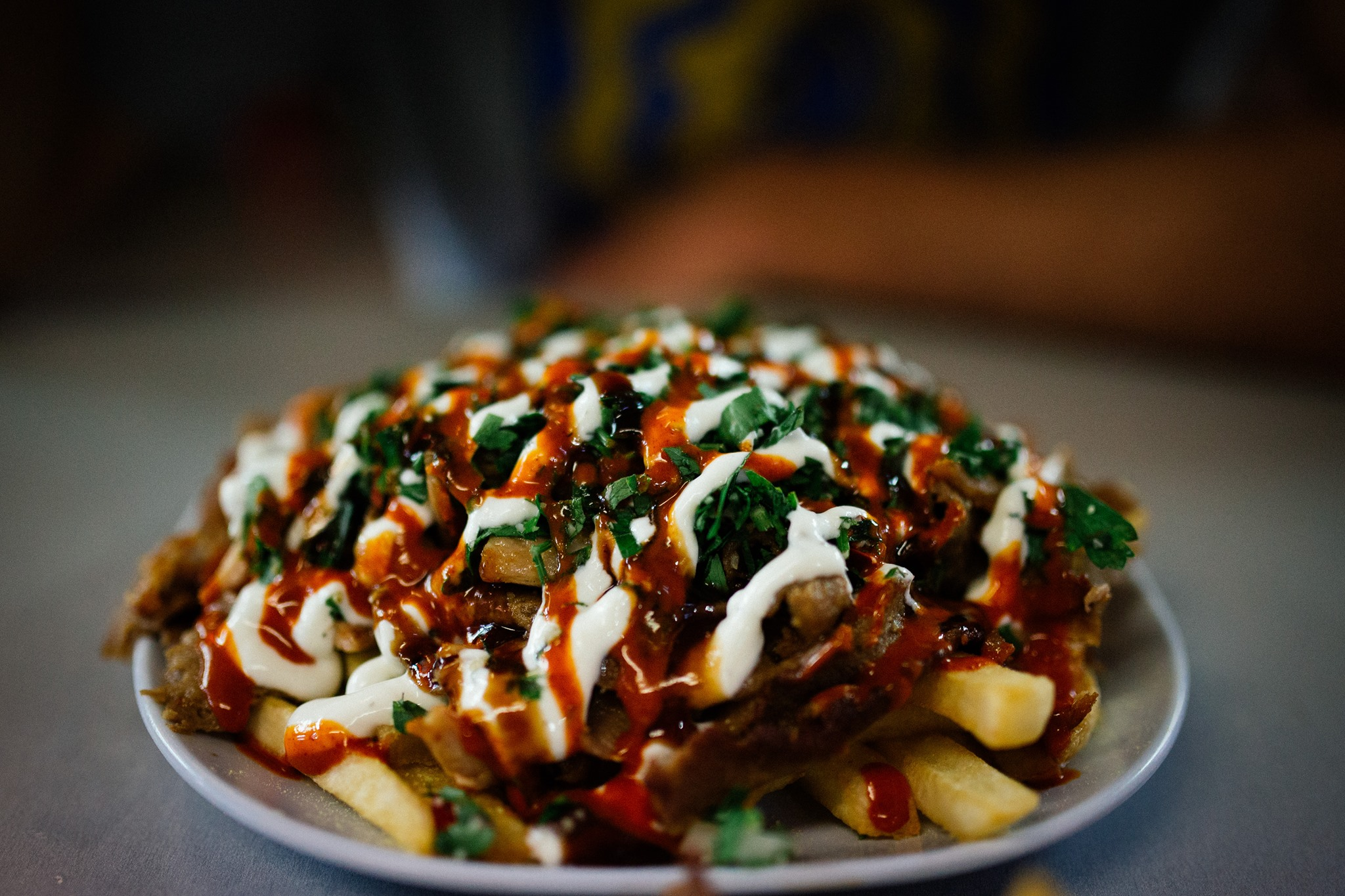
A halal snack pack served on a ceramic plate

In July 2016, then-Labor Senator Sam Dastyari invited the One Nation party leader Pauline Hanson out for a halal snack pack after she won a Senate seat in the 2016 Australian federal election. She rejected his proposal, saying, "It’s not happening, not interested in halal, thank you". Hanson then elaborated, stating, "I’m not interested in it. I don’t believe in halal certification," and went on to claim that "98 percent of Australians" opposed it. In response, several Australian restaurants created a Pauline Hanson-inspired halal snack pack. There has also been a GoFundMe campaign to turn Hanson's former fish and chip shop into a pop-up halal snack pack stand.

== Similar dishes ==
The "AB" dish in Adelaide is gyros meat topped with chips, garlic sauce or chilli sauce, and sometimes barbecue sauce or tomato sauce. The dish is sometimes served with alcoholic beverages. Two restaurants in Adelaide claim they invented the dish: the North Adelaide Burger Bar (also known as the Red & White) between 1969 and 1972, and the Blue & White in 1989. The "AB" may be placed at the centre of the table and shared.

The Healthy Snack Pack is a variant of the Halal Snack Pack where the chips are replaced by a choice of salad.

Similar dishes

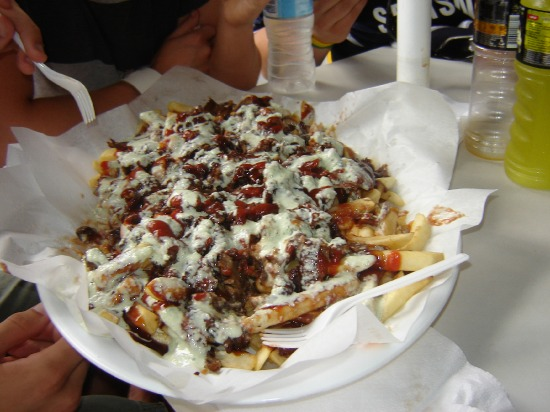
An "AB" from Adelaide

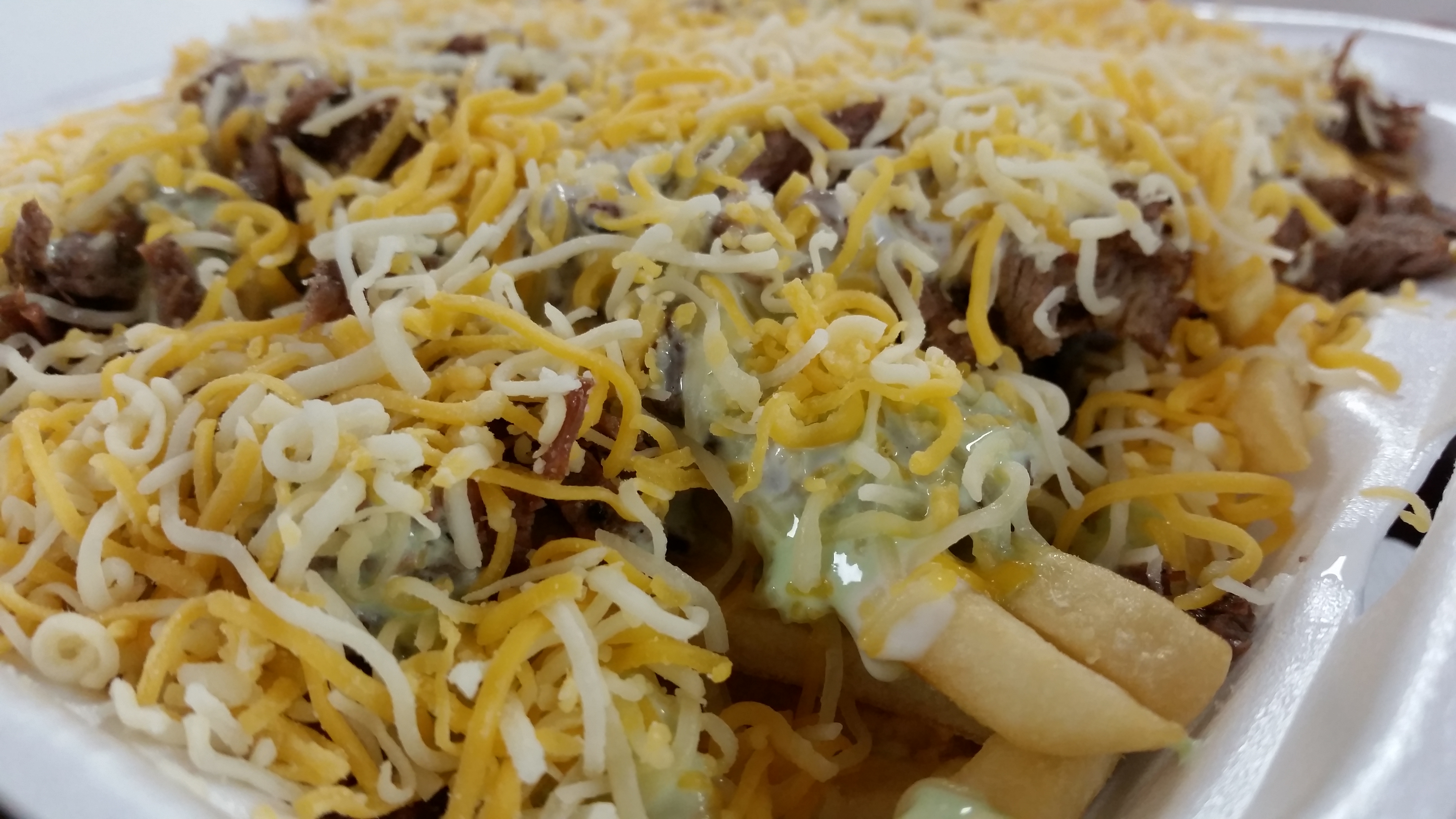
Carne asada fries at Tacos El Gordo, Chula Vista, California

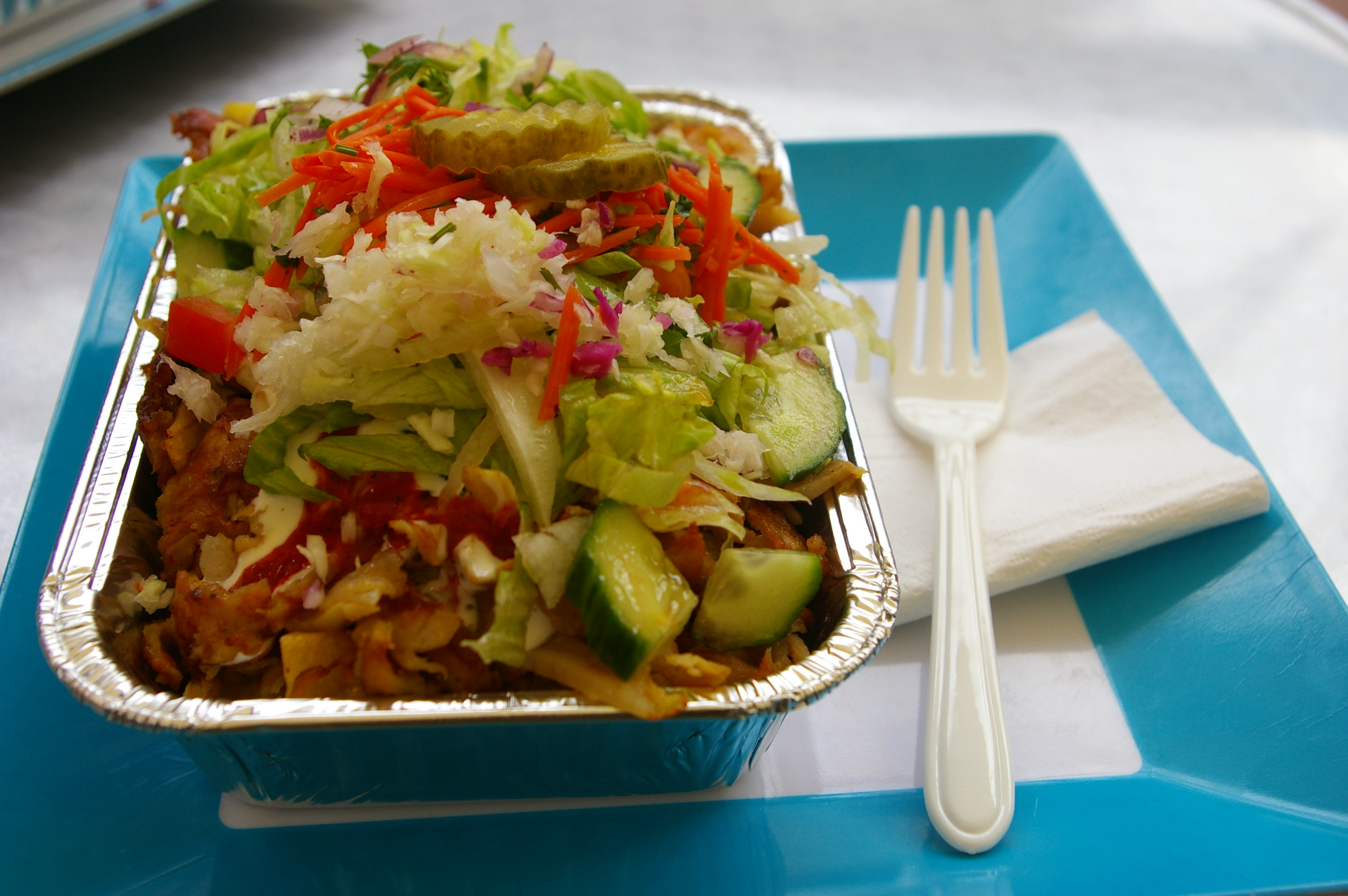
Kapsalon

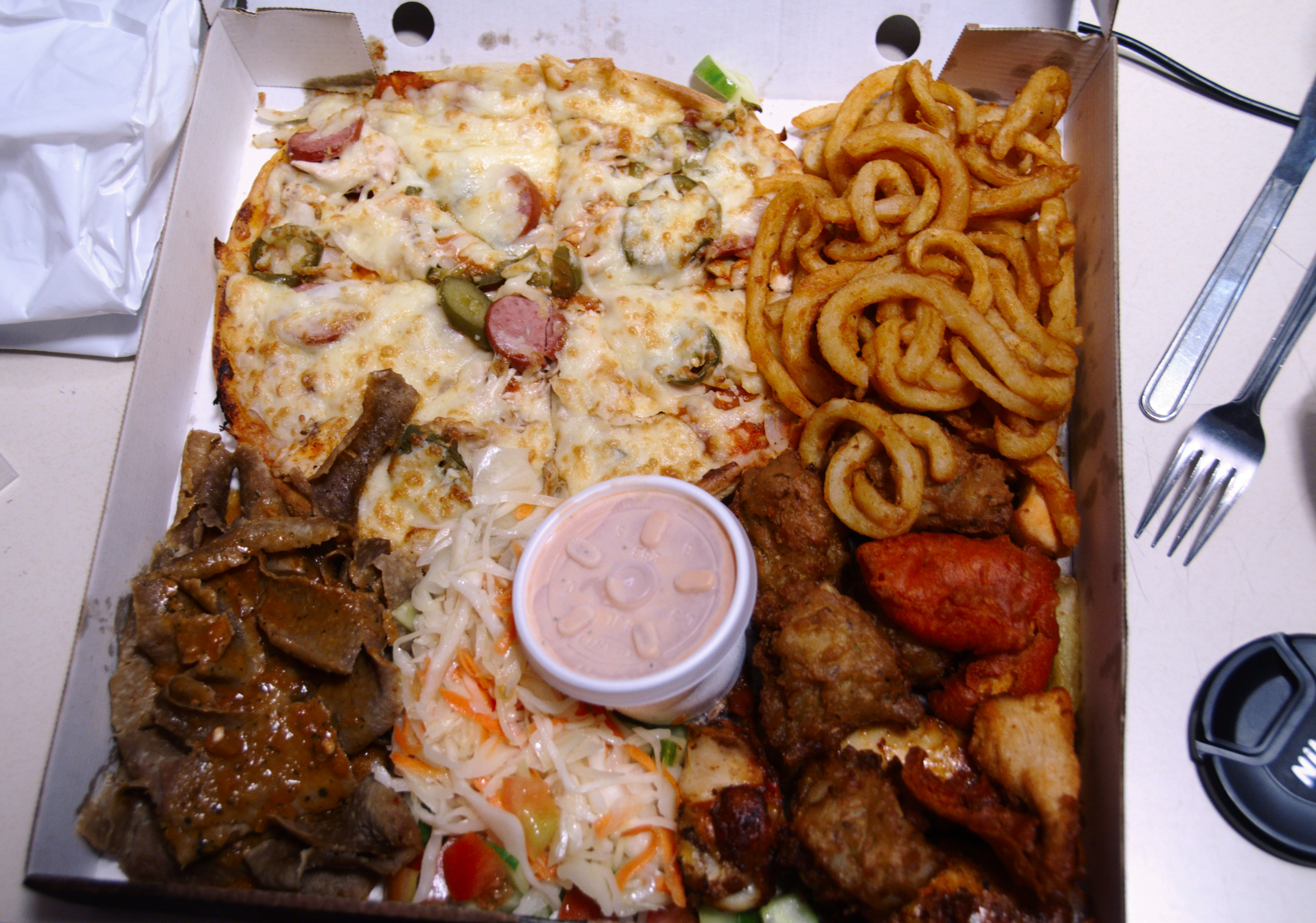
A "munchy box"

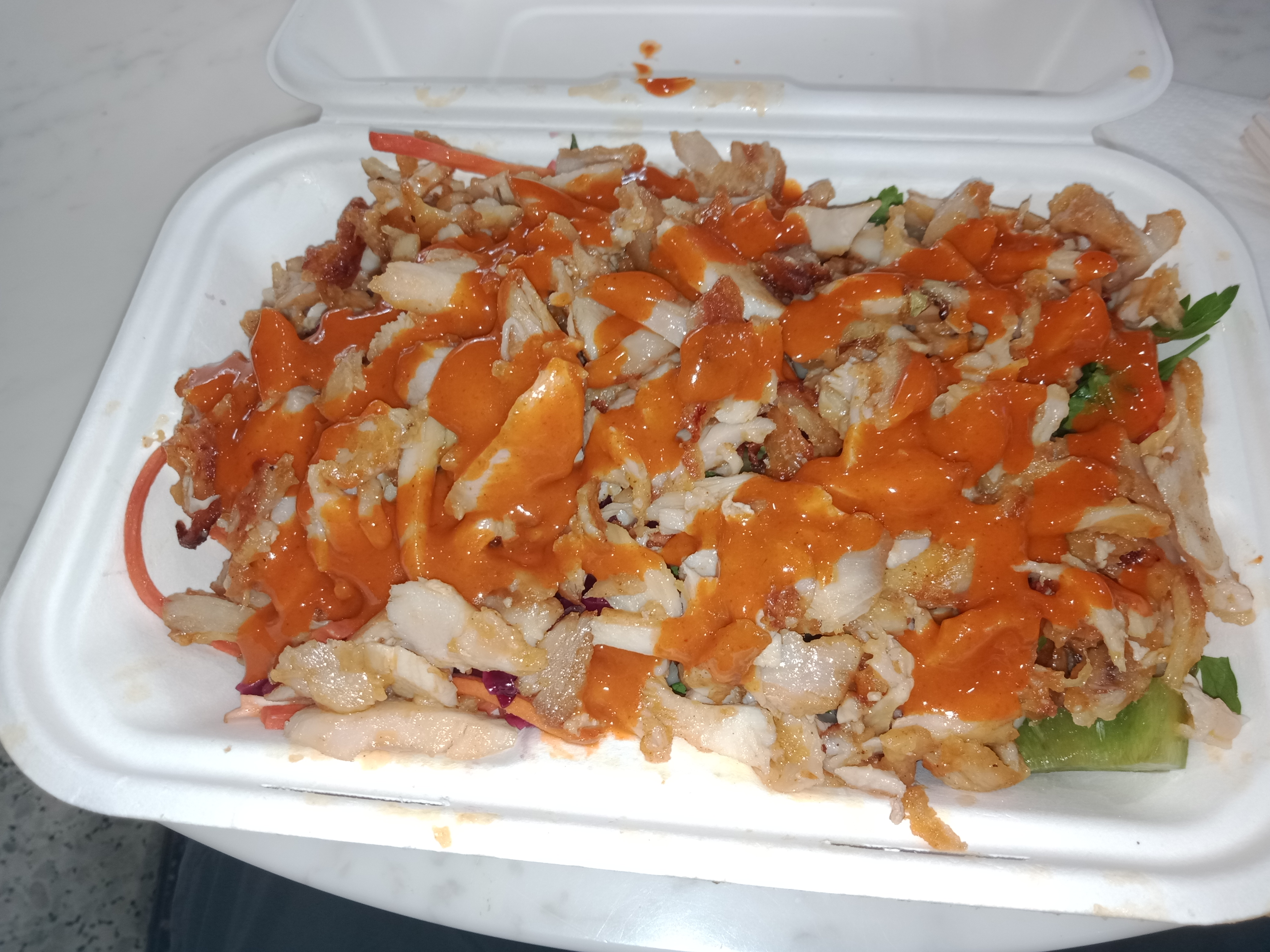
A chicken Healthy Snack Pack from Penrith, New South Wales

== See also ==
- Munchy box – an inexpensive dish sold by fast-food and takeaway restaurants, primarily in the West of Scotland region and Glasgow
- Poutine – a Canadian dish originating in Quebec, prepared with french fries and cheese curds topped with a light brown gravy
- Spice bag – a chip-based fast food dish popular in Ireland inspired by East and Southeast Asian cuisine
- Yaroa – a similar street food in the Dominican Republic
- Garbage plate – a similar dish from Rochester, New York, United States
- List of accompaniments to french fries
- List of meat and potato dishes
