= Loaded fries =

Potato dish

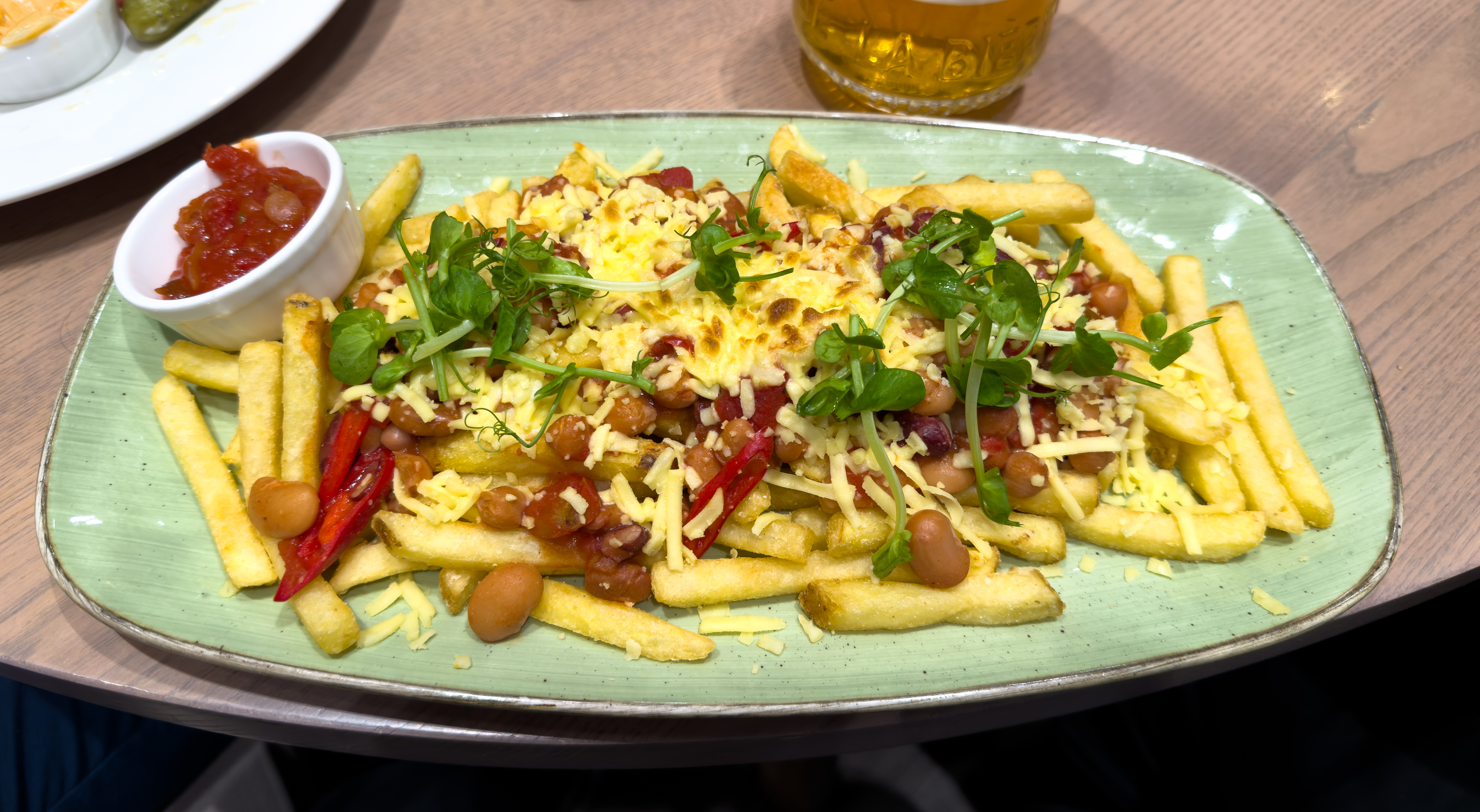
- Type: Fast food
- Course: Appetizer, side dish
- Associated cuisine: American Cuisine
- Main ingredients: French fries
- Ingredients generally used: Meats, cheese, sauces, vegetables

Loaded fries is a dish consisting of French fries topped with various combinations of cheese, sauces, meat, and/or vegetables.

== Description ==
Loaded fries are noted for being a cheap but filling dish. They are served with various toppings. Common ingredients include cheese, chopped bacon, and garnishes like sliced green onions or jalapeños. They are commonly served at Super Bowl parties in the United States. Variations of loaded fries based on dishes from Tex-Mex and Indian cuisine are also popular.

== See also ==
- Chorrillana
- Cheese fries
- Chili cheese fries
- Disco fries
- Kapsalon
- Potato skins, a similar dish
- Poutine
- Revuelto Gramajo
- Salchipapa, a Peruvian loaded fries dish
- Yaroa, a Dominican loaded fries dish
