= Munchy box =

Inexpensive takeaway fast-food from Scotland

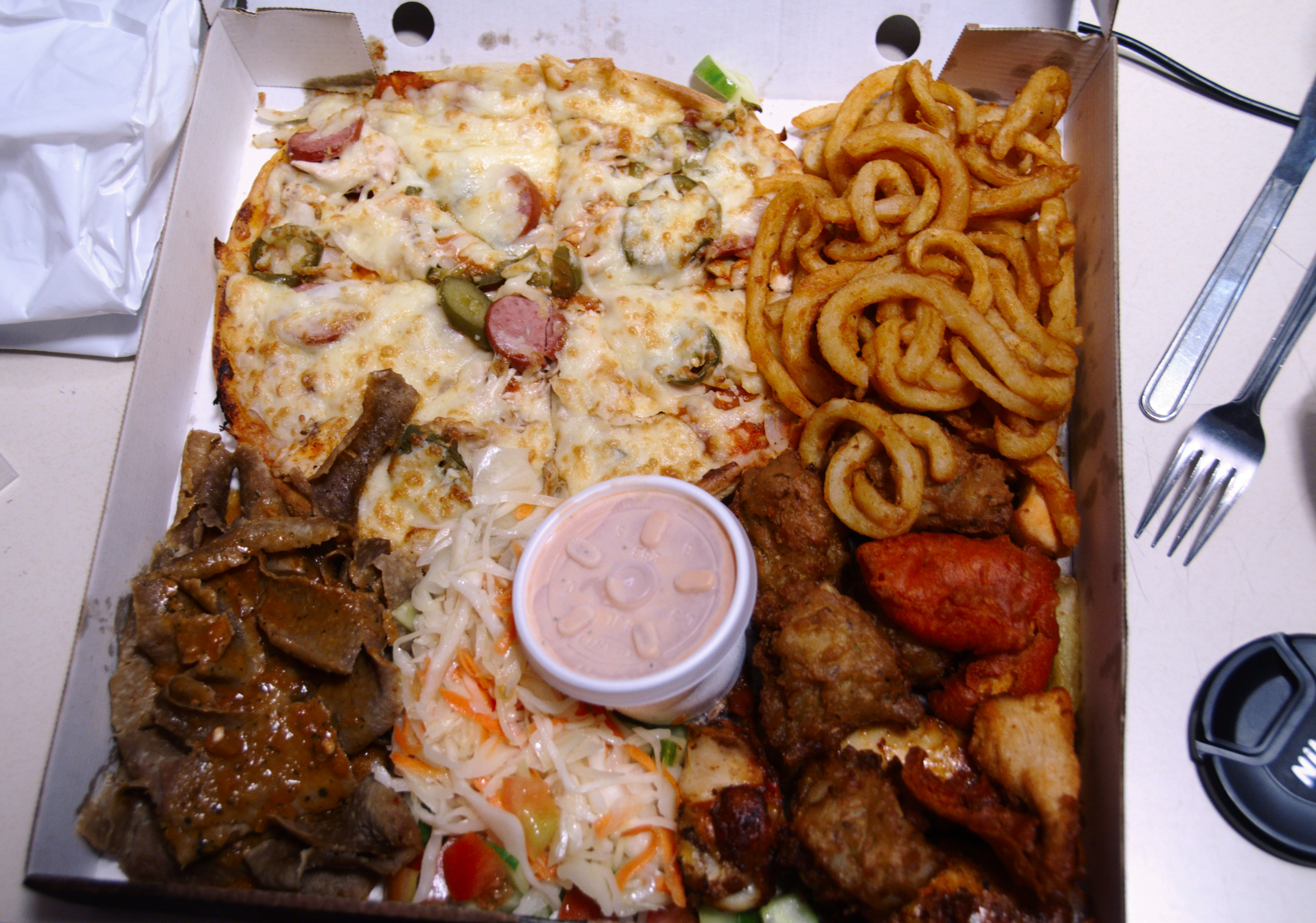
- A munchy box: clockwise from the top: pizza, chips, pakora (vegetable (left) and chicken (right)), a tub of sauce, salad, and doner meat
- Type: Fast food
- Place of origin: Scotland
- Main ingredients: Kebab meat, fried chicken, pizza, chicken tikka, samosas, onion rings, chow mein, pakora, naan, garlic bread, coleslaw

A munchy box or munchie box is an inexpensive fast-food product sold from takeaway restaurants, primarily in Scotland and Glasgow in particular, but also in many other parts from Aberdeen to Rothesay. It consists of an assortment of fast foods served in a large pizza box. The selection of foods included in some boxes has been criticised for being nutritionally poor.

== Ingredients and nutrition ==
The contents of a traditional munchy box vary but may typically include kebab meat, chicken tikka, samosas, chow mein noodles, pakora, naan, and other fast foods and sauces such as curry sauce. There is sometimes a salad item and, invariably, chips or fried rice. Another common variation of the take away is salt and pepper chili munchy box. While it is not clear whether a munchy box is intended to be consumed as a meal for one, there has been concern of the health implications if it is consumed as such. A less traditional munchie box may also include a pizza, chicken nuggets, garlic bread, mozzarella sticks and coleslaw.

There have been reports of healthier options of munchy boxes. The healthy option might be composed of tortillas, cherry tomatoes, a salad, boiled eggs, sliced gammon, raw red onions, nachos, chicken mayo, a sprinkling of cheese and other healthy foods. Sushi is sometimes included in the healthier option.

== Criticism ==
The combination of very large portions and low prices has made the munchy box popular; however, its contents, consisting mostly of deep fried or fatty foods, have led to health concerns among some Scottish politicians and health campaigners, particularly if consumed by children. Glasgow City Council has undertaken nutritional analysis of munchy boxes on sale in the west of Scotland with the intention of encouraging restaurants to include healthier ingredients and reduce portion sizes.

== See also ==
- Halal snack pack
- Kapsalon
- Scottish cuisine
- Glasgow effect
- Bento
- Spice bag – a fast food dish popular in Ireland inspired by Asian cuisine
- Garbage Plate
