= Disco fries =

Dish of french fries with gravy and cheese

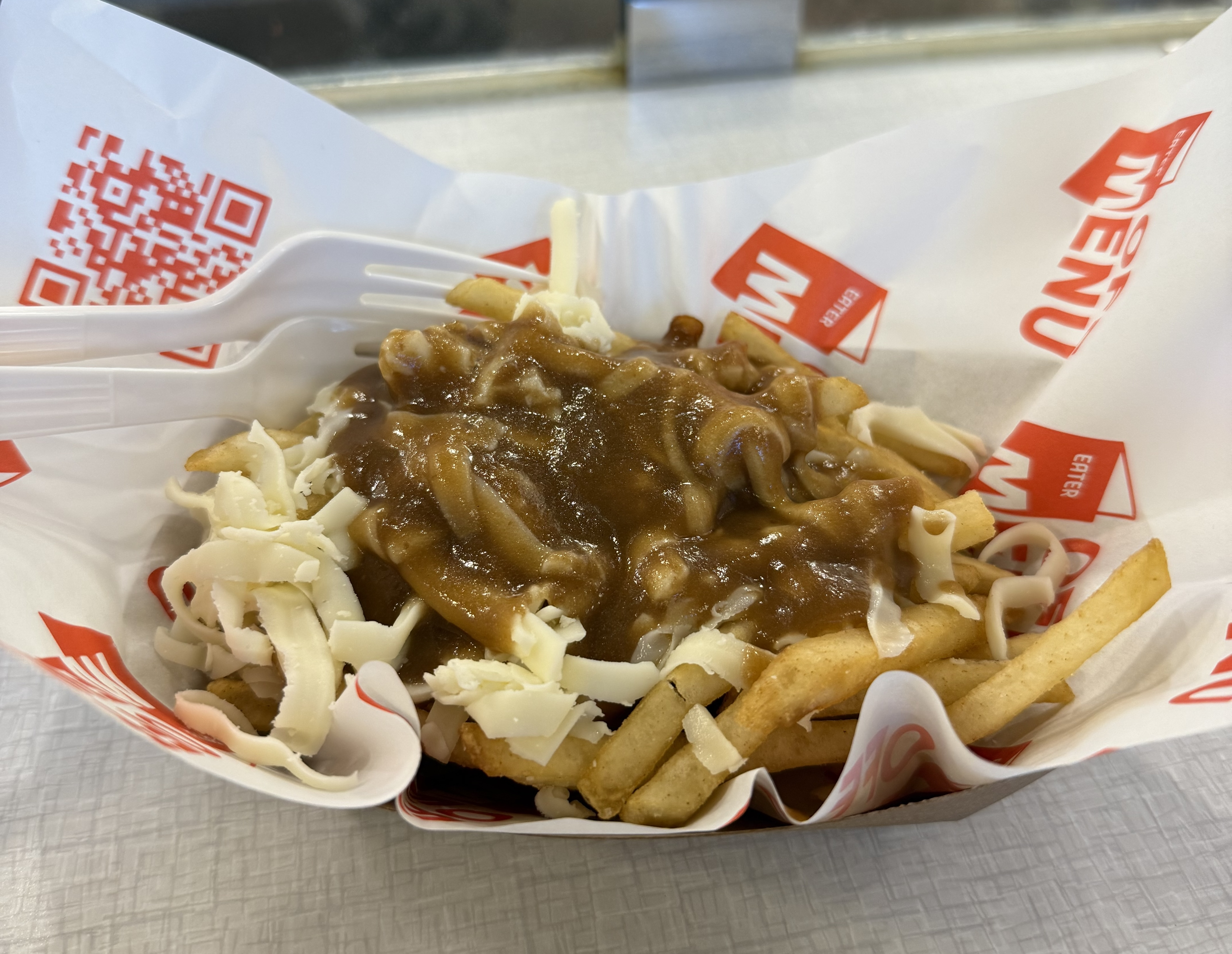
- Disco fries at Hamburger America
- Type: Fast food
- Course: Side dish, snack
- Place of origin: United States
- Region or state: New Jersey
- Main ingredients: French fries, brown gravy, melted shredded cheese

Disco fries are a dish of American origin consisting of french fries topped with brown gravy and melted shredded cheese (typically mozzarella). Popularized in the 1970s by the Tick Tock Diner in Clifton, New Jersey, they are a staple of New Jersey cuisine, commonly served at diners throughout the state.

In the 2020s, disco fries gained popularity at restaurants throughout the United States. In 2024, The Takeout wrote that disco fries "may be New Jersey's greatest contribution to the snack food pantheon".

== History ==
While there is some dispute over their origin, locals widely agree that disco fries first appeared by name on the menu at the 24/7 service Tick Tock Diner in Clifton, New Jersey, U.S., in the 1970s. In their original form at the diner, the dish was topped with melted mozzarella and brown turkey gravy. The dish derives its name from its popularity as a late-night snack among young crowds returning from disco nightclubs, especially as "drunk food".

John Russell of LGBTQ Nation argues that disco fries are emblematic of the cuisine of LGBTQ culture in the United States, given their popularity among gay nightclub–goers and their association with the queer disco community of the 1970s. A 2025 book by Erik Piepenburg titled Dining Out: First Dates, Defiant Nights, and Last Call Disco Fries at America's Gay Restaurants discusses the history of LGBTQ cuisine in the United States.

== Variants ==
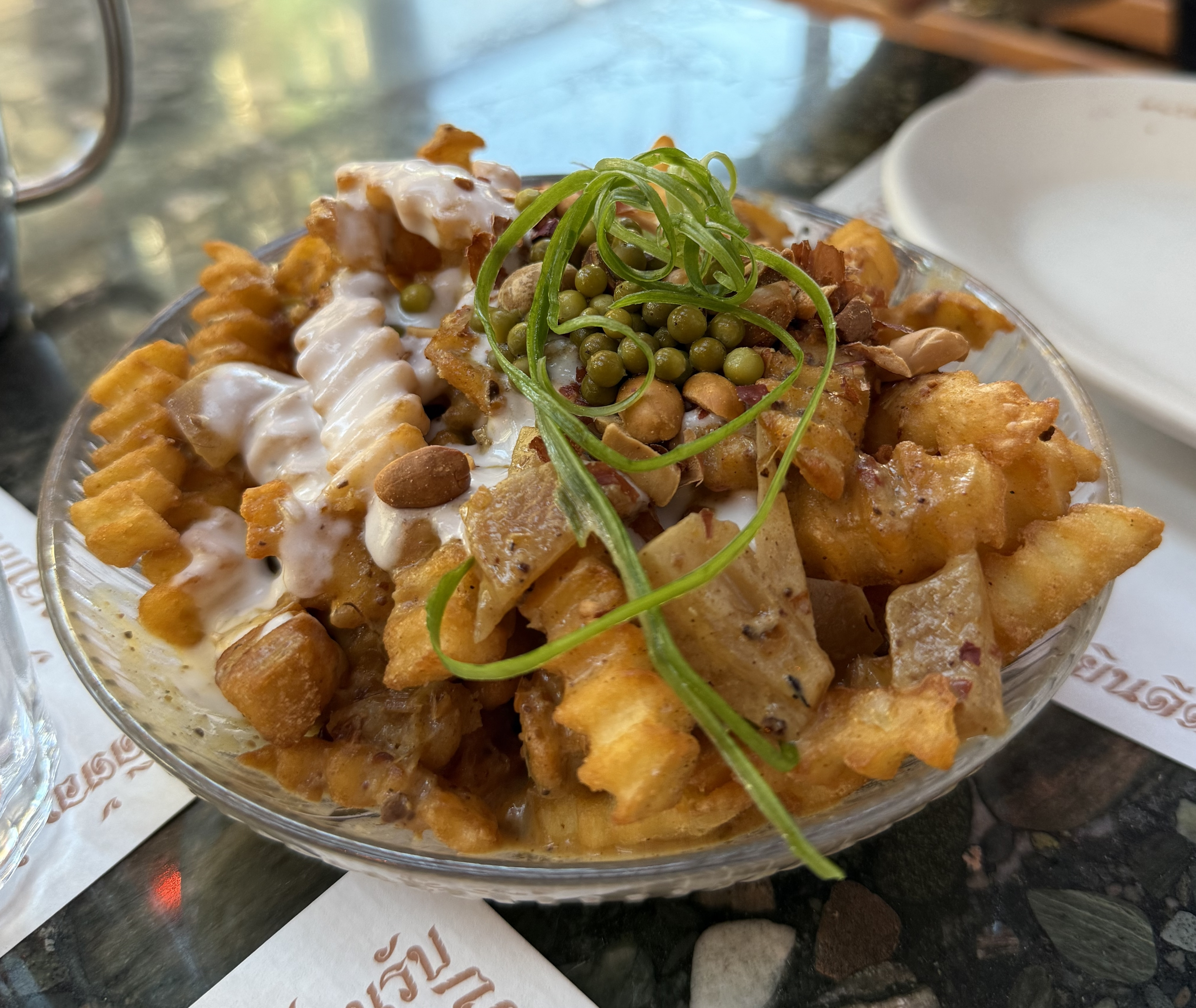
Thai disco fries at Thai Diner in Nolita, Manhattan

While disco fries are traditionally topped with melted shredded mozzarella cheese, some variants opt for cheddar, Gruyère, provolone, or American cheese.

In the 2020s, in what Eater dubbed a "disco fries fever," variants of disco fries spread beyond New Jersey to restaurants throughout the United States. Notable examples include the Thai disco fries at Thai Diner in Nolita, Manhattan, which are topped with a massaman curry, peanuts, and coconut milk; a variant with five spice and chicken gravy at King BBQ in Charleston, South Carolina; and a variant with brisket, pho gravy and sambal aioli at Little Rituals in Phoenix, Arizona.

Disco fries are often compared to the Canadian dish poutine, which was similarly popularized in the late 20th century, and is solely distinguished by its use of cheese curds in place of melted cheese.

== See also ==
- Cheese fries
- Garbage Plate
- Loaded fries
