= Three in One =

Three in One or 3-in-1 may refer to:

- 3-In-One Oil, a general-purpose lubricating oil
- Three in One (film), a 1957 Australian anthology film
- Three in One, high-occupancy vehicle lane in Indonesia
- 3 in 1, 2012 album by Wali
- 3-in-1 (fast food dish), an Irish dish consisting of chips, rice and curry sauce
- The Christian concept of the Trinity
