= Jar jow =

Char siu and vegetables in sweet and sour sauce

- Type: Stir fry
- Course: Main course
- Place of origin: East London
- Associated cuisine: British Chinese cuisine
- Serving temperature: Hot
- Main ingredients: Char siu; Bamboo shoots; Onions; Peppers

Jar jow is a dish from British Chinese cuisine made from chopped char siu and vegetables in a sweet and sour sauce. It is strongly associated with East London and is thought to have originated in Limehouse.

== History ==
The dish is believed to have been brought to the Limehouse district of London by Cantonese or Shanghainese dockworkers in the late 18th or early 19th century. Cassie Womack, in an article for Tasting Table, reported that the dish was reputed to be based on "Beijing noodle sauce". Jar jow was one of the most popular dishes at Maxim's restaurant in Soho, a Cantonese food restaurant founded by Chung Koon in 1908. The dish became a popular takeaway item at Chinese restaurants in East London. Outside of East London, jar jow is not widely served or eaten.

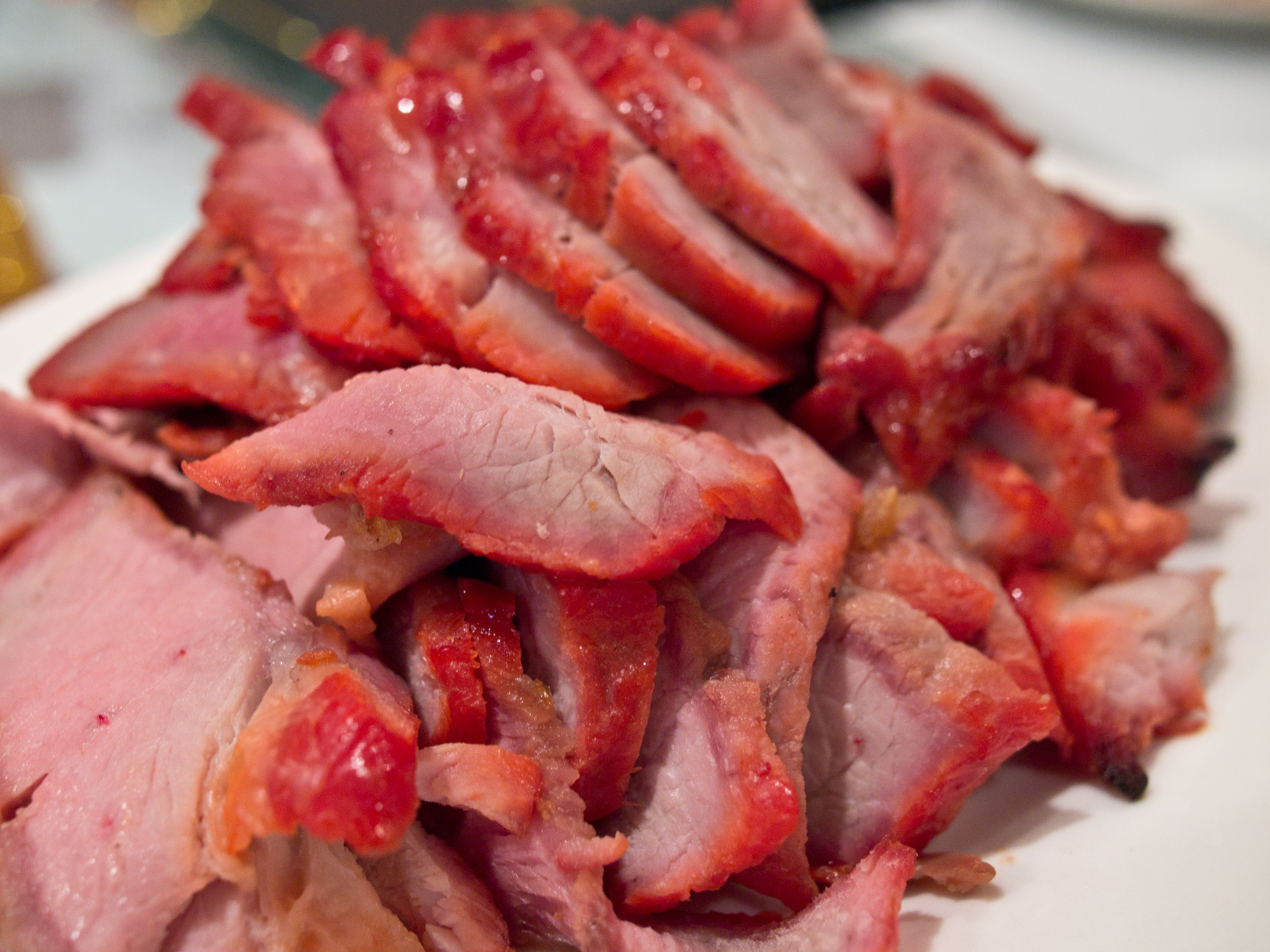
Pieces of char siu, shown here, are stir fried with vegetables and sauce to make jar jow

Jar jow has become less popular in the late 20th and early 21st century, although it still has a loyal local following in East London. Its decline was partly due to the demise of the Chinatown neighborhood in Limehouse after the district was bombed in World War II. After the bombings, a new Chinatown was established in Soho by immigrants from Hong Kong. This led to the gradual disappearance of traditional Chinese restaurants in Limehouse. Reporting on the state of Chinese cuisine in London in 2021, Fuchsia Dunlop of Financial Times described the "almost total disappearance of the Chinese and their old Jar Jow from Limehouse". The increasing popularity of American Chinese cuisine in England, such as chop suey and chow mein, has also contributed to the decreasing popularity of traditional British Chinese dishes like jar jow.

== Description ==
Jar jow is prepared by stir frying slices of barbecue pork, called char siu, in oil with pork rinds, bamboo shoots, green bell peppers, and onions. It is then coated in a tomato paste-based sauce that has been thickened with starch. The sauce may include chilli powder and other seasonings. This sauce has been described as sweet and sour.
