= Potato skins =

Potato dish

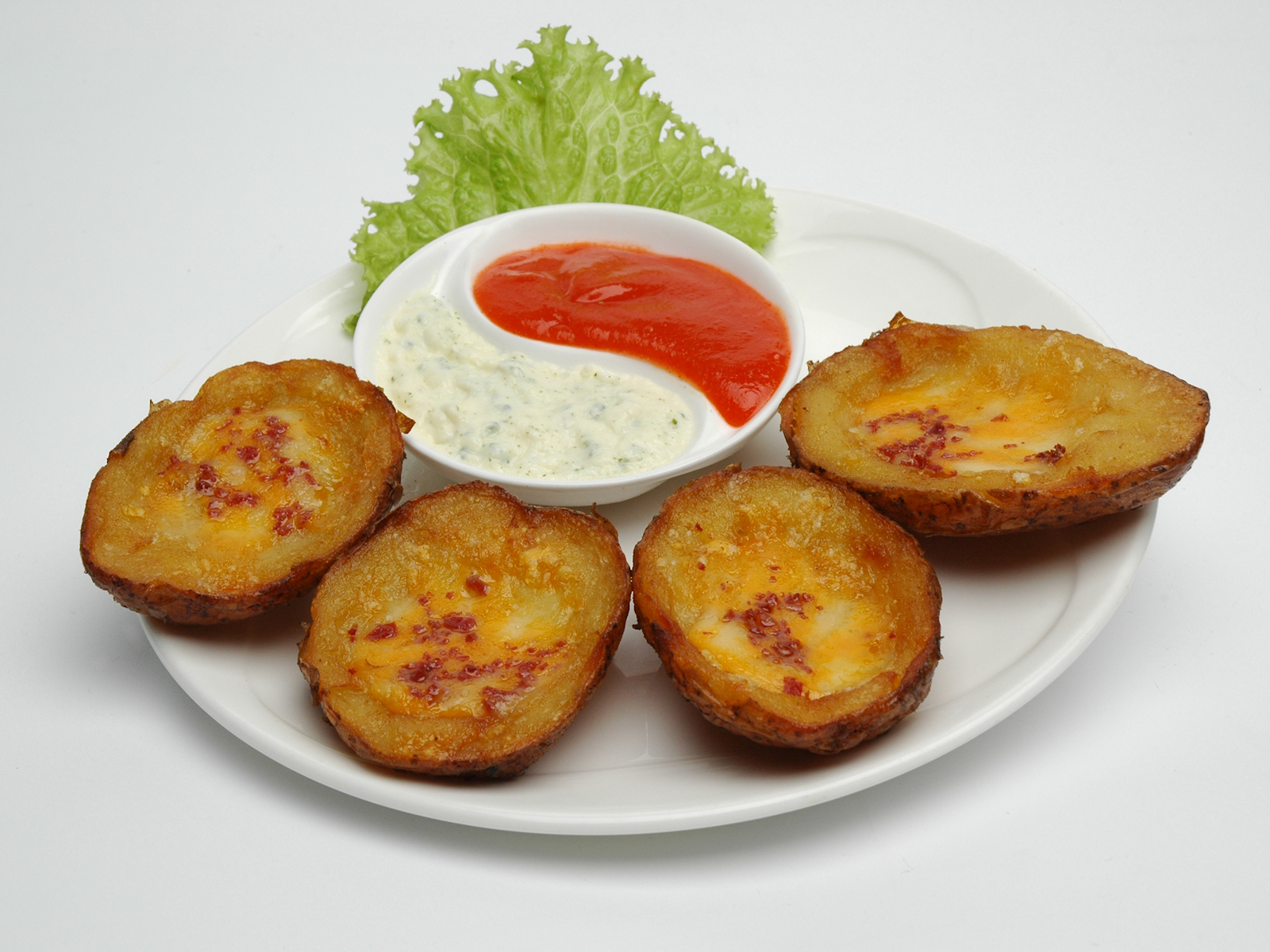
- Potato skins accompanied by dipping sauces, presented as an appetizer
- Course: Appetizer
- Place of origin: United States
- Serving temperature: Hot
- Main ingredients: Potato, cheddar cheese, bacon
- Variations: Pizza skins

Potato skins, also sometimes referred to as potato jackets, are a snack food or appetizer made of unpeeled potato halves, hollowed and dressed with bacon, cheddar cheese and green onions before being baked again. They are commonly found on the menus of casual dining restaurants in the United States. While popularly eaten in restaurants and pubs, these snacks are also commonly made at home or can be purchased frozen at grocery stores.

== History ==
As an appetizer in restaurants, potato skins have been around since approximately the 1970s, with documentation of their preparation as early as 1974. Many restaurants such as TGI Fridays, Prime Rib Restaurant, and R.J. Grunts of Lettuce Entertain You Enterprises have claims to be some of the first restaurants to serve the dish.

== See also ==
- Loaded fries
- List of hors d'oeuvre
