= Spice bag =

Fast food dish created in Ireland

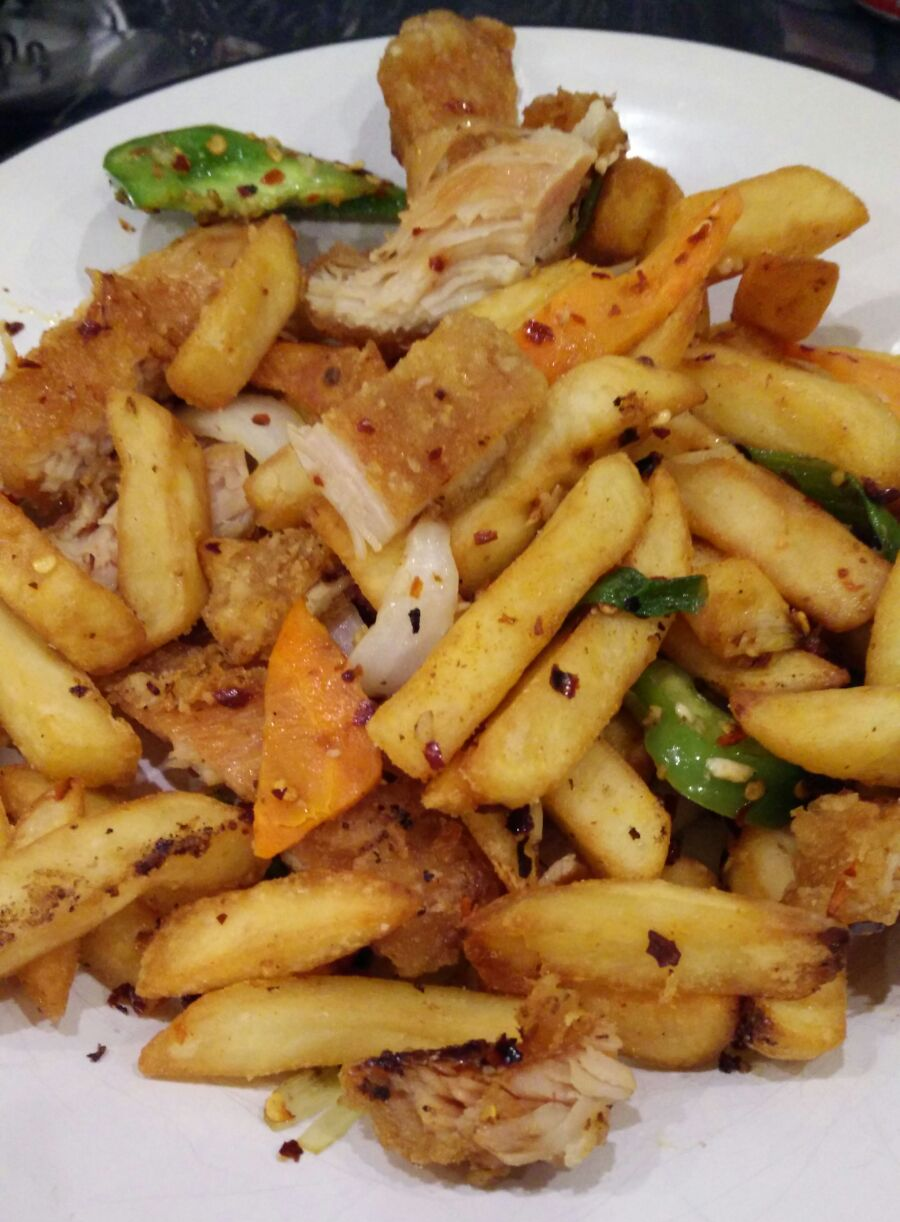
- A spice bag, served on a plate
- Alternative names: Spicebag, spicy bag, spice box, spicy box
- Place of origin: Ireland
- Serving temperature: Hot
- Main ingredients: Fried chicken, Sichuan pepper, five-spice powder, Thai chili, onions, peppers, chips, salt

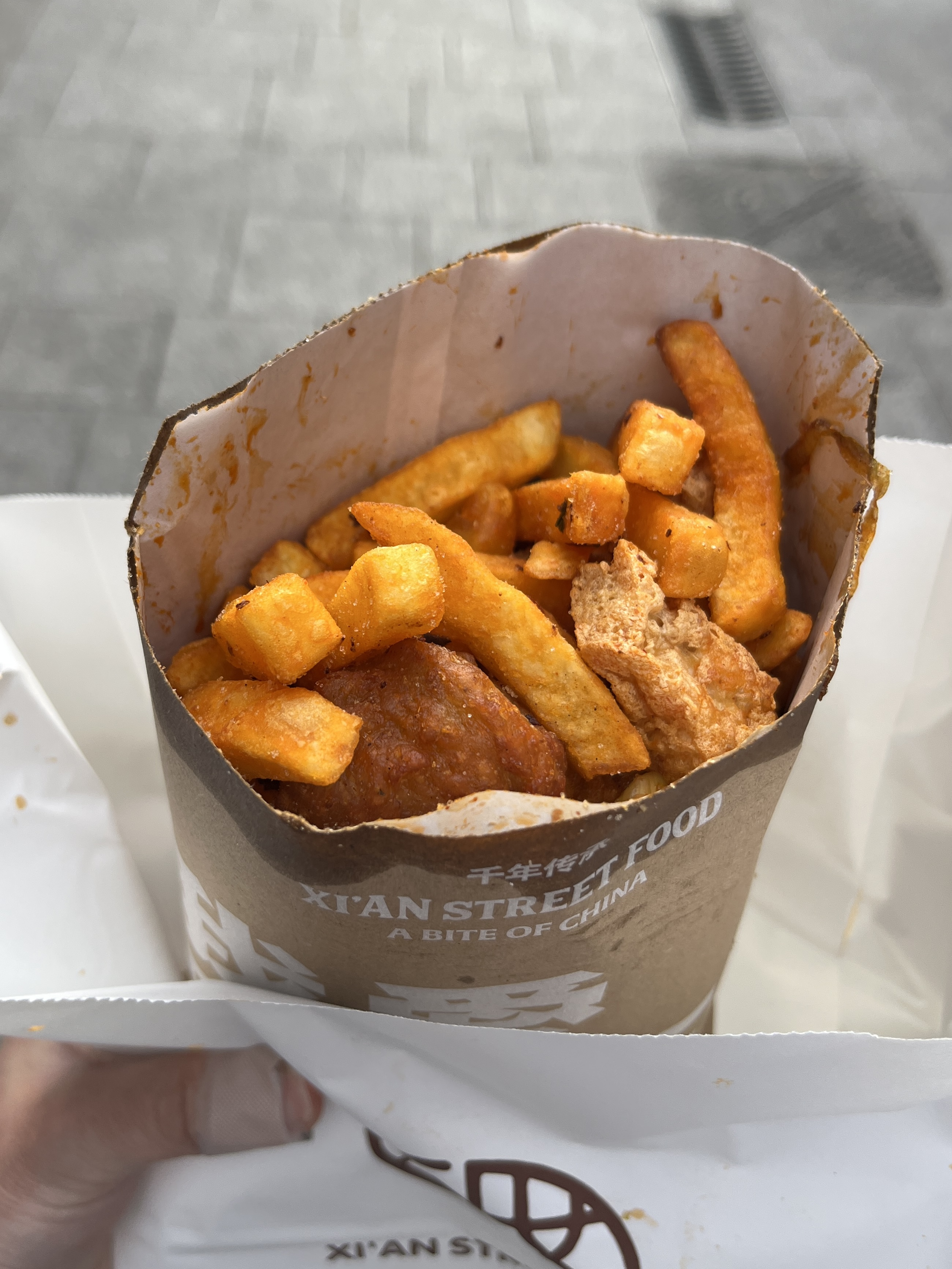
A vegetarian spice bag

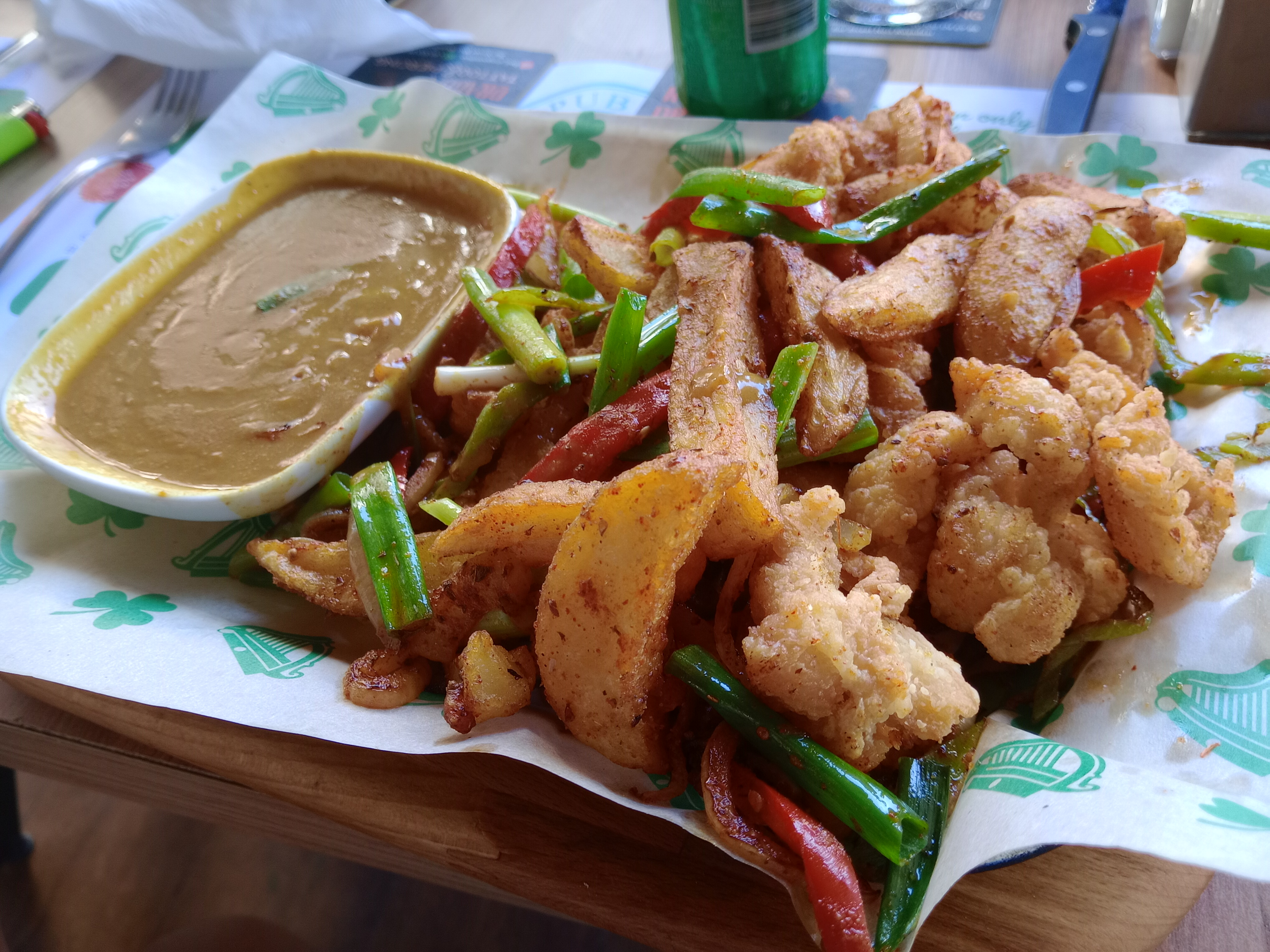
A spice bag with curry sauce

A spice bag (or spicebag, spicy bag; Irish: mála spíosrach) is a fast food dish, popular in most of Ireland and inspired by Chinese cuisine. The dish is most commonly sold in Chinese takeaways in Ireland, and Irish-themed restaurants elsewhere. Typically, a spice bag consists of deep-fried salt and chilli chips, salt and chilli chicken (usually shredded, occasionally balls/wings), red and green peppers, sliced chili peppers, fried onions and a variety of spices served in a paper bag. The dish can also be packaged in a paper box as a spice box (or spicy box). A vegetarian or vegan option is often available, in which deep fried tofu takes the place of the shredded chicken. It is sometimes accompanied by a tub of curry sauce.

Available in Chinese takeaways and chip shops since the 2010s, the dish has developed something of a cult following, and a Facebook group created as a tribute to the dish has attracted over 17,000 members. It is often cited as a popular hangover cure. It was voted 'Ireland's Favourite Takeaway Dish' in the 2020 Just Eat National Takeaway Awards in the Republic of Ireland, while in 2021 Deliveroo Ireland started a petition to create a "National Spice Bag Day". The dish is not as common in Northern Ireland.

According to research by RTÉ Radio reporter Liam Geraghty, the dish was created in around 2006 as an off-the-menu, after-hours meal by staff at the Sunflower Chinese takeaway restaurant in the Orwell Shopping Centre in Templeogue, Dublin. When friends of the staff repeatedly asked for the meal, the dish was added to the Sunflower's menu. The first spice bag offered by the online food delivery company Just Eat was in 2012.

== See also ==
- Munchy box
- Salt and pepper chips
- Chip spice
- Three-in-one
- List of meat and potato dishes
