= Carne asada fries =

Dish originating from San Diego, U.S.

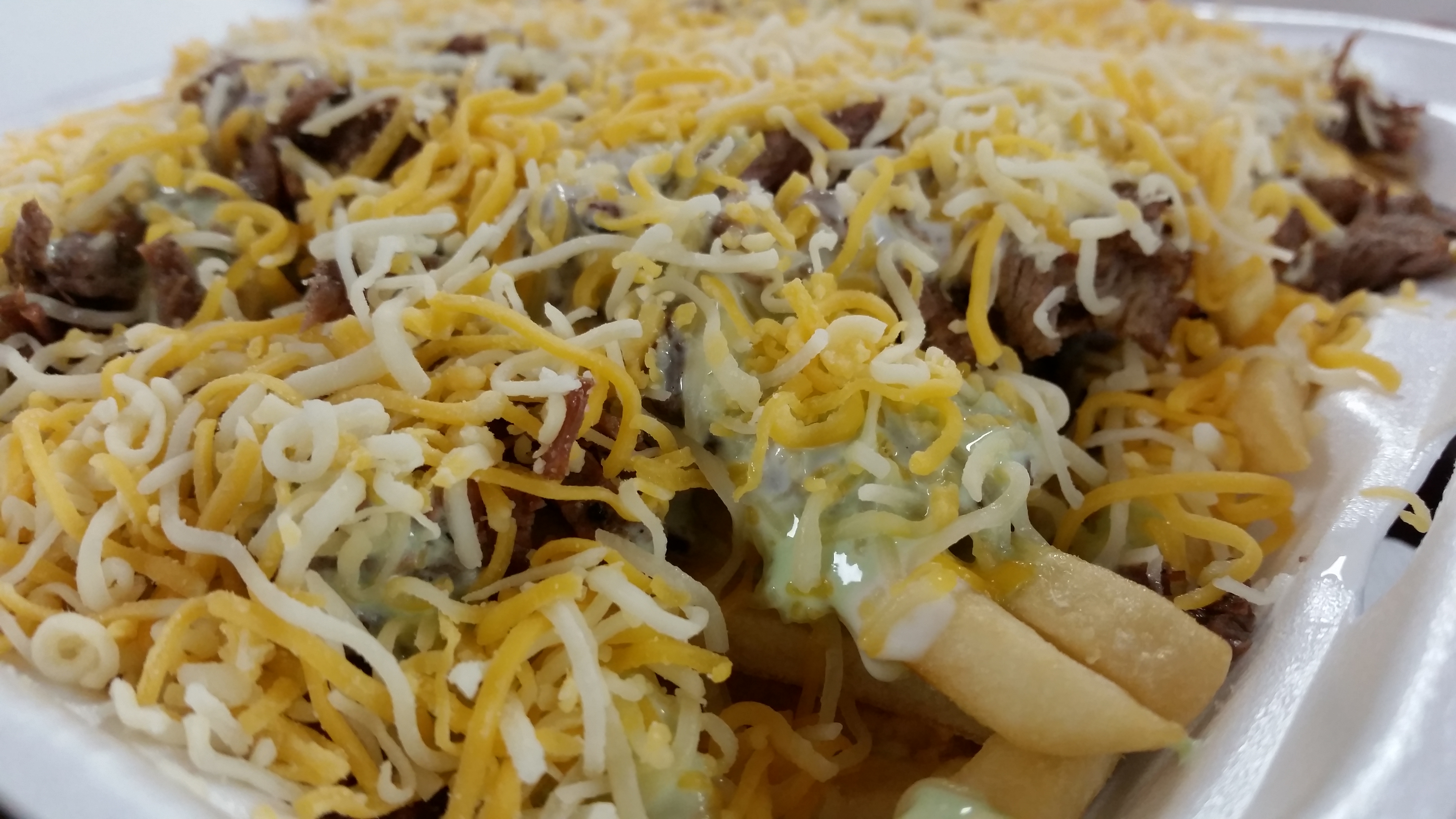
- Place of origin: United States, Mexico
- Region or state: San Diego, California
- Associated cuisine: Mexican-American Cuisine
- Main ingredients: French fries, carne asada, guacamole, sour cream, cheese
- Food energy (per serving): 1,129.0 kcal (4,724 kJ)

Carne asada fries is a local dish speciality found on the menus of restaurants primarily in the American Southwest, including San Diego, where it originated.

== History ==
Carne asada fries is a Mexican-American dish originating in the Chicano community in San Diego. This item is not normally featured on the menu at more traditional Mexican restaurants. Lolita's Mexican Food in San Diego claims to have originated the dish in the late 1990s, inspired by a suggestion from their tortilla distributor.

The dish is also served at Petco Park and Dodger Stadium. By 2015, fast food chain Del Taco began to sell the item.

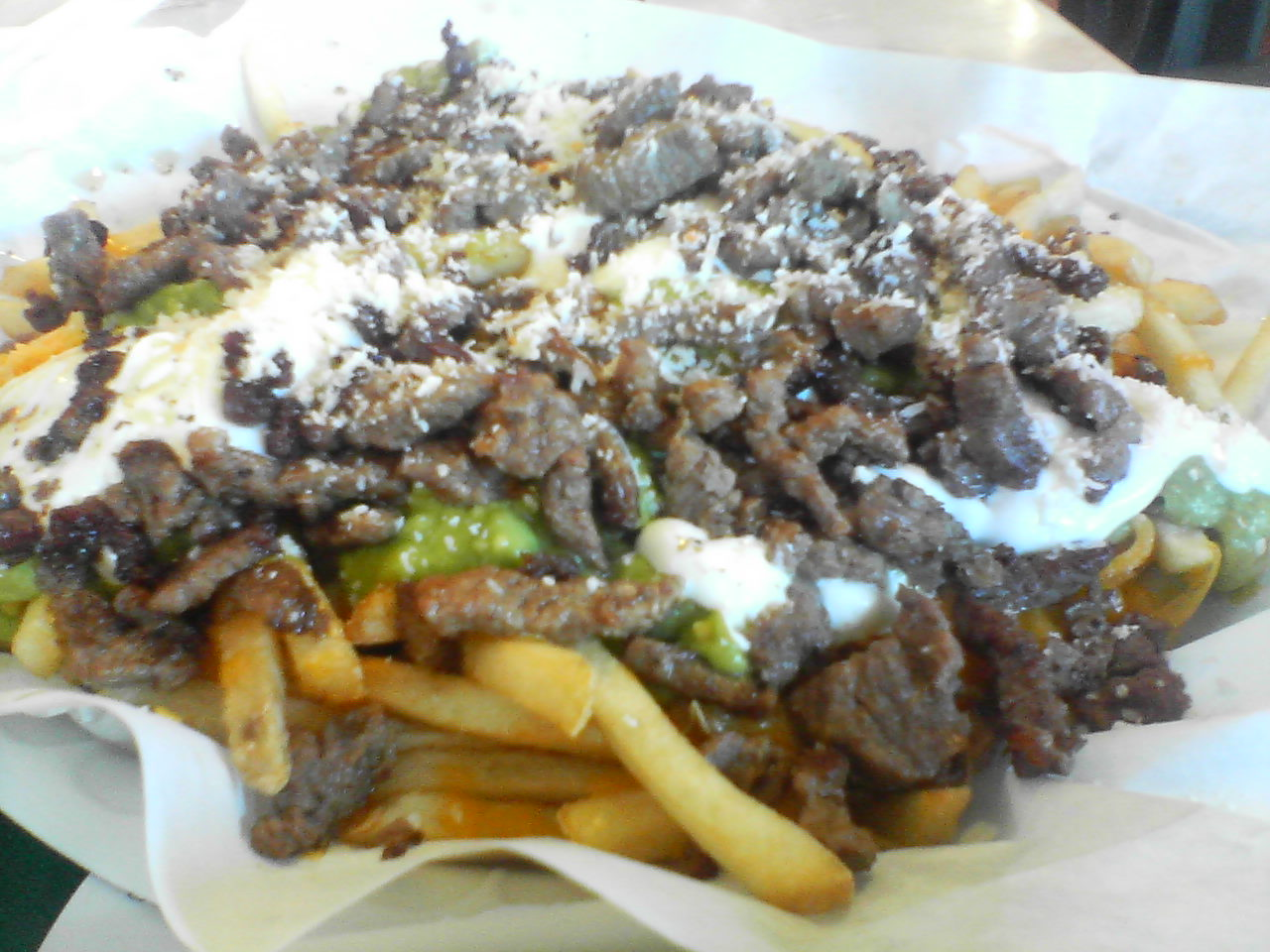
Carne asada fries

== Ingredients ==
The dish typically consists of french fries, carne asada, guacamole, sour cream, cheese, and sometimes salsa. The fries are often of the shoestring variety, but other cuts may be used as well. The carne asada is usually finely chopped to avoid the need for a knife or additional cutting on the part of the consumer. The cheese is commonly cotija, although many establishments use a less-costly shredded cheese mix which melts with the other ingredients and keeps longer.

In Los Angeles, the dish may also contain refried beans.

The dish is high in calories, with a meal-sized portion containing 2000 calories or more.

== Similar dishes ==
- California burrito
- Chili cheese fries
- Halal snack pack
- Kapsalon
- Poutine
- Salchipapa

== See also ==
- List of meat and potato dishes
