= 3-in-1 (fast food dish) =

Menu item in Irish fast food outlets

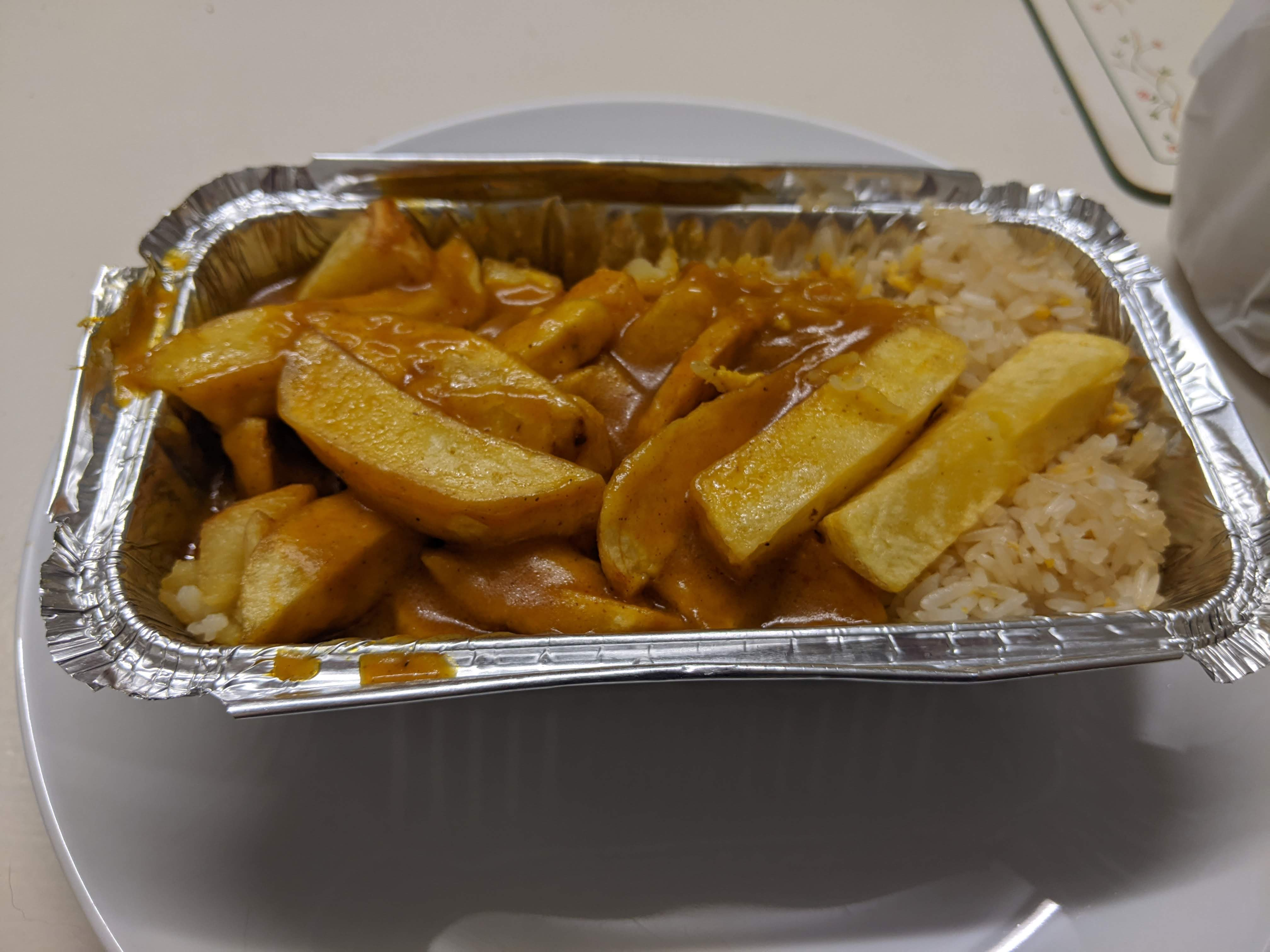
- The 3-in-1 dish
- Alternative names: Trio; Three-in-one
- Place of origin: Ireland
- Serving temperature: Hot in a takeaway container
- Main ingredients: chips; boiled, egg-fried, or fried rice; curry sauce

A 3-in-1, trio or three-in-one is a fast-food dish consisting of chips, boiled rice (or egg fried rice), and curry sauce served in a single foil tray or plastic container. It became popular in Ireland as a dish from chip shops and Chinese restaurants in the early twenty-first century. It developed a cult following in the 2010s, and media outlets debated the merits of it compared to a spice bag, which became popular around the same time.

Related dishes (four-, five-in one) contain additional ingredients such as chicken balls, or chicken or beef pieces.
