= British Chinese cuisine =

Chinese cuisine developed by British Chinese

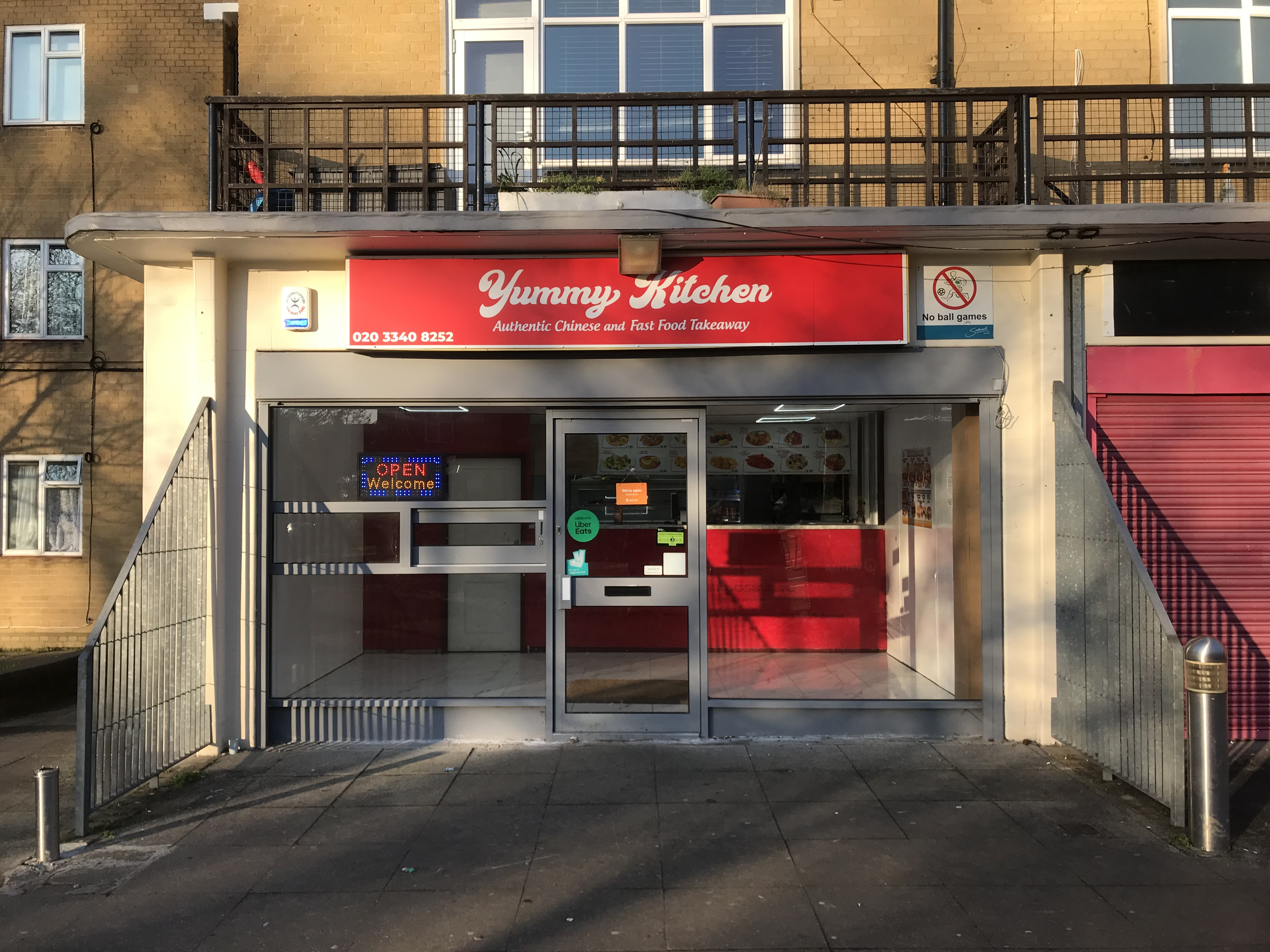
- A typical British Chinese style take-away restaurant in Kingswood Estate, London, 2025
- Type: British cuisine
- Place of origin: Liverpool and London
- Associated cuisine: British and Cantonese
- Created by: British Chinese
- Invented: 1880s – post-war

British Chinese cuisine is a style of Chinese cuisine developed by British Chinese people in the United Kingdom, typically adapted to British tastes but increasingly inspired by authentic Cantonese dishes. It is considered a major part of British cuisine. It often consists of Sichuan cuisine and Cantonese cuisine with chips and curry sauce available, which are not known for being traditionally Chinese but are food staples in the UK.

== History ==
In the early 1880s, Chinese food items and eating houses appeared in London and Liverpool, mainly visited by Chinese seamen and students.

Part of the British Empire from 1841 to 1997, Hong Kong and the New Territories were an integral part of an established trade route, attracting European shipping companies that would enlist Southern Cantonese men as seafarers, who in turn travelled and resettled in the United Kingdom. To sustain the burgeoning Chinese communities and cater to sailors' needs, they began setting up informal noodle shops. This practice reached its pinnacle between the two World Wars.

London had its first recorded Chinese restaurant open in 1907 or 1908.

During the mid-1900s, after the Second World War, a significant shift occurred in UK immigration policies, permitting increased migration to address the post-war demand for labour. As a result, a "restaurant boom" emerged within the Chinese community. Between 1957 and 1964, the number of Chinese food establishments experienced a twofold increase, with a considerable portion of these establishments catering to the tastes and preferences of non-Chinese clientele. The restaurants were operated largely by Hong Kongers who moved to the UK.

In Liverpool, due to a high number of Chinese-operated fish & chip shops, Chinese food and traditional 'chippy' fast food are often combined and are usually interchangeable in the region's dialect. This is thought to have occurred sometime in the 20th century.

In 2011, the Ming-Ai (London) Institute launched the British Chinese Food Culture project with a grant from the Heritage Lottery Fund, aimed at exploring and tracking the changes in Chinese food throughout its history in the United Kingdom.

In 2020, the coronavirus pandemic negatively impacted many Chinese restaurants in the UK, with a number of restaurants in London's Chinatown in particular facing financial difficulty as a result of prejudice against Chinese takeaways, based on fears described by the BBC as "unfounded".

== Cuisine and regional variations ==
Chinese food is considered a major part of British cuisine. In 2017, over 80% of Londoners reported having been to a Chinese takeaway.

Some Chinese takeaway restaurants in Britain have developed original recipes such as crispy duck pancakes, a variation on Peking duck consisting of aromatic crispy duck on savoury spring pancakes usually served with julienned cucumber, spring onions and hoisin sauce. Another dish is jar jow, a stir-fried dish of sliced char siu, bamboo shoots, onions and green pepper seasoned with chilli powder and tomato paste. In Northern England, particularly Liverpool where they originate, salt and pepper chips, which are made of chips stir fried with salt and pepper seasoning, peppers and onions, are popular. By the late 2010s, the popularity of old-fashioned dishes like jar jow had faded in favour of American-style Chinese dishes such as chop suey and Americanised chow mein in Chinese takeaways, whereas many other restaurants throughout Britain increasingly offer authentic Chinese dishes.

== See also ==
- Chicken balls
- Fusion cuisine
- American Chinese cuisine
- Canadian Chinese cuisine
- Australian Chinese cuisine
- New Zealand Chinese cuisine
