= Salt and pepper chips =

British Chinese dish

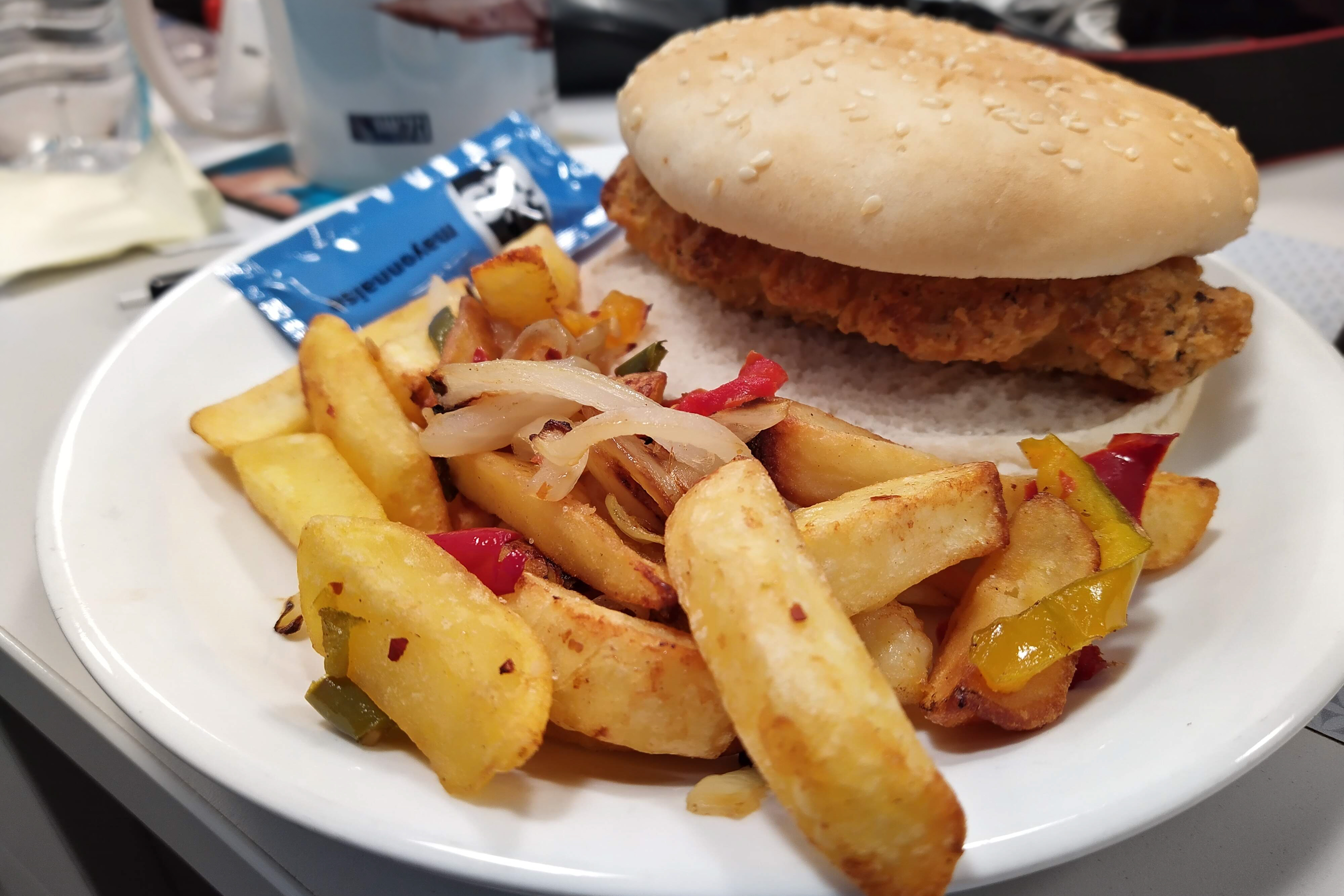
- Salt and pepper chips, with a chicken burger
- Type: French fries
- Course: Appetizer
- Place of origin: Liverpool, England
- Associated cuisine: British Chinese cuisine
- Main ingredients: Chips, bell peppers, chili peppers, onions

Salt and pepper chips is a British Chinese dish consisting of chipped potatoes mixed with stir-fried onions, chili peppers and bell peppers.

== History ==
The dish was invented by Chinese immigrant-owned fish-and-chip shops in Liverpool, Merseyside, England, and is a fusion of Chinese and British cuisine. It began to be served during the 1960s. It is primarily eaten in Northern England and Scotland, where it has become a fixture of Chinese takeaway restaurants.

== Description ==
The dish is prepared by stir frying sliced onions, bell peppers and bird's eye chili peppers together with Sichuan pepper and black pepper. The mixture is seasoned with monosodium glutamate, salt, garlic, five-spice powder and sugar. The chips are then tossed with the mixture and served.

== See also ==
- Spice bag
