= Cheese fries =

Fast-food dish of fries and cheese

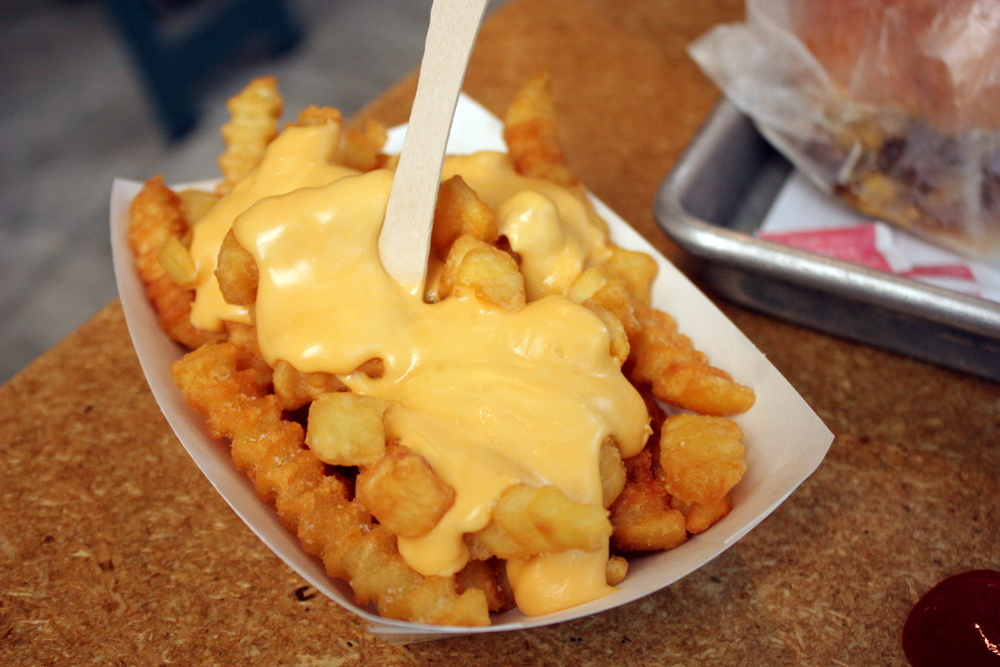
- Cheese fries served by a Shake Shack outlet in New York City
- Alternative names: Cheesy chips, chips and cheese
- Type: Fast food
- Course: Side dish, snack
- Main ingredients: French fries, cheese

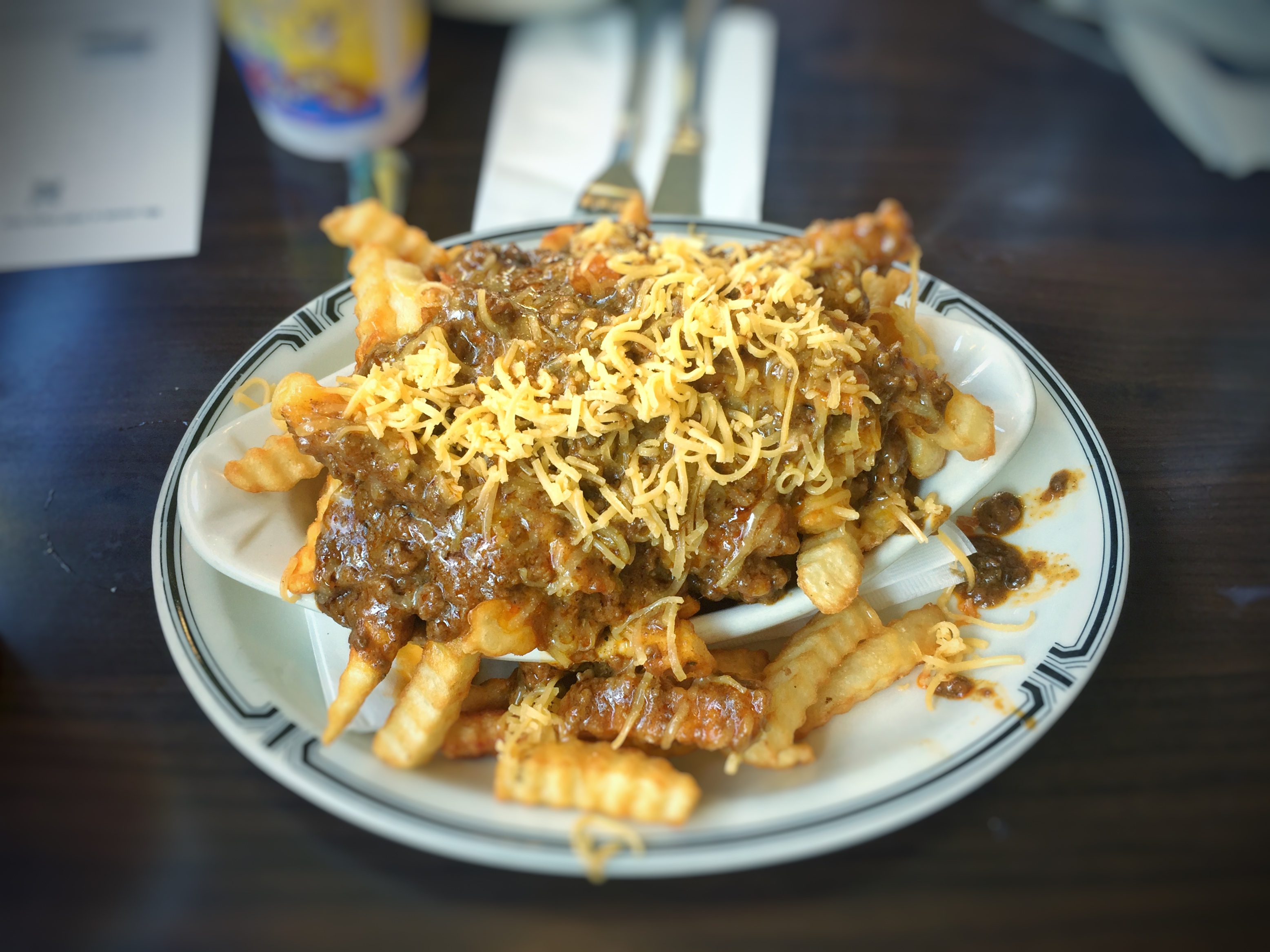
Chili cheese fries, topped with chili con carne

Cheese fries (or in the United Kingdom cheesy chips) is a dish consisting of French fries covered in cheese, with the possible addition of various other toppings. Cheese fries are generally served as either a lunch or dinner dish. They can be found in fast food locations, diners, and grills mainly in English speaking countries.

== Origins ==
The origin of the dish is not known. Cheese fries have been said to have grown in popularity in the United States after canned cheese products such as Cheez Whiz were introduced in 1952. Don A. Jenkins is said to have invented the chili cheese fry variation at the age of 16, in Tomball, Texas. Another report claims that a young fry cook named Austin Ruse was the first to serve this dish while working at Dairy Queen in St. Charles, Missouri.

== Variations ==
=== United States ===
Throughout the Southwest U.S., loaded fries are often covered in melted cheddar cheese, bacon bits, jalapeño slices, and chives, and served with ranch dressing. Alternately, they are also served as carne asada fries.

In Philadelphia, pizza fries are topped with melted mozzarella and served with pizza sauce on the side, while "mega fries" are topped with cheddar (or sometimes Cheez Whiz) and mozzarella cheese and bacon, usually served with a side of ranch dressing.

In New York City, Long Island, and New Jersey, they are covered with melted American, mozzarella, or Swiss cheese. Disco fries have the addition of brown gravy.

In other parts of the U.S., nacho cheese is often used, especially at snack stands.

Chili cheese fries are topped with chili con carne. The cheese is usually either American or cheddar. In Cincinnati, Ohio, they use their own Cincinnati chili for their chili cheese fries at the local chili restaurants. In New Mexico, they use New Mexico chile for their chili cheese fries, often adding chopped lettuce, tomato, and olives as garnish.

In Puerto Rico, they have gained some popularity on fast food trucks known as crazy fries (papas locas). Potatoes, yams, batata (a white sweet potato with purple skin), cassava fries or mofongo are coated with bacon, cheese with roasted pork, chicken, beef or all three, drizzled with ketchup and mayonnaise. Maize, chopped lettuce, coriander, avocado, tomatoes, and bell peppers are often added as a garnish.

=== Internationally ===
In Ireland, a variation called "taco fries" consists of fresh-cut fries covered in ground beef, tomato, peppers, onions, and various seasonings. This is covered in salsa and shredded cheddar. Another staple of Irish fast food restaurants, both stand-alone chippers or chains such as Supermac's, is "Garlic Cheese Chips", which consists of chips covered in garlic sauce and cheese, usually cheddar.

In Bulgaria, a common side dish offered in most restaurants consists of French fries, topped with grated or crumbled sirene.

In the Netherlands, a dish named kapsalon is served as fast food. This consists of fries covered with cheese, salad, and shawarma or doner kebab. It is often consumed with large amounts of garlic sauce or chili sauce.

In the United Kingdom, cheesy chips are often served in pubs. Preparation includes the pouring of cheddar sauce over chips or sprinkling grated cheddar over chips and then putting the dish under a grill. A popular version in pubs is loaded fries which are made with french fries served with nacho sauce, crispy onions, sour cream and bacon bits. A variation adds beef gravy or curry sauce. In some cases mozzarella cheese is used rather than cheddar, particularly in takeaway restaurants which sell pizza.

== See also ==
- Poutine
- Pub grub
