= Yaroa =

Dominican street food

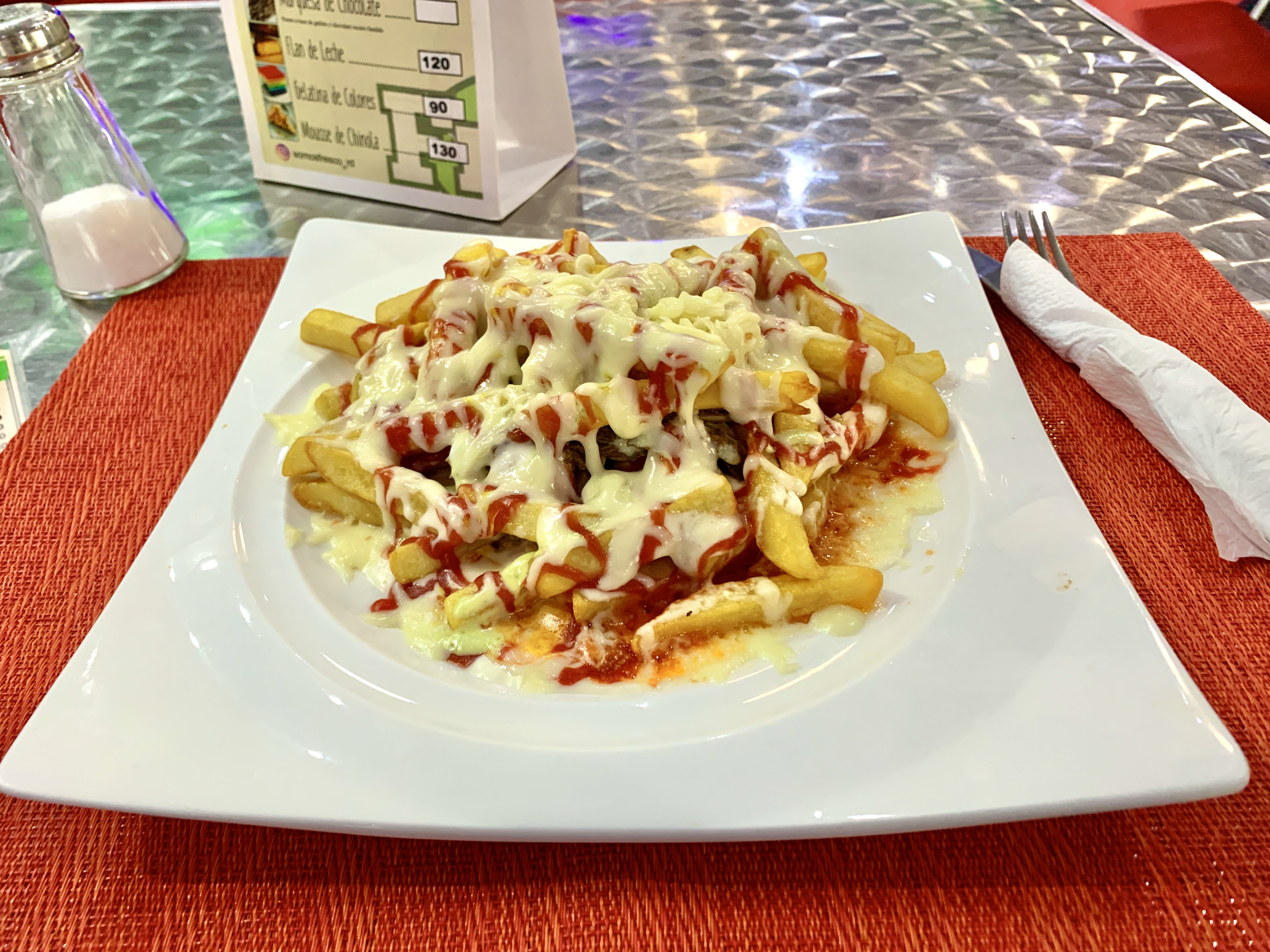
- Yaroa mixta
- Type: Fast food
- Place of origin: Dominican Republic
- Region or state: Latin America, Caribbean
- Main ingredients: Root vegetable, meat, cheese, condiments

Yaroa is a Dominican street food that originated from Santiago de los Caballeros. It is made from French fries or a mash of a root vegetable or tuber such as plantain or yuca, then layered with meat and then cheese. Toppings such as hot sauce, jalapeños, or fresh herbs like cilantro are sometimes added to enhance flavor. Condiments such as mayonnaise, ketchup, and mustard are also often added on top. Beef, pork, chicken, or a combination of the meats is a common part of the dish. There are many versions throughout the country.

Street food vendors in food trucks often sell the dish. Because it is relatively quick and easy to prepare, it is suitably served as a fast food. It is a popular street food often eaten by young revelers at night in a Styrofoam to-go container. Prior to its creation, the chimichurri burger and sandwich de pierna (pork sandwich) were the main street foods to eat at night.

The name is derived from a neighborhood in Santiago. At first, it was served in a hood neighborhood called El Ejido, then at the area around the Monument of Santiago by street vendors at about 1999. The popularity spread to the point where a popular Dominican fast food chain now serves the dish. Now it can be found internationally in places such as New York City and Lawrence, MA.

It has been compared to Canadian poutines, salchipapa, loaded fries and cheese fries.
