= King BBQ =

Restaurant in North Charleston, South Carolina, U.S.

- Interactive map of King BBQ

Restaurant information
- Location: 2029 Carver Avenue, North Charleston, South Carolina, 29405, United States
- Coordinates: 32°51′17″N 79°58′27″W
- Website: eatkingbbq.com

King BBQ is a restaurant in North Charleston, South Carolina, United States. It was named one of the twenty best new restaurants of 2024 by Bon Appétit.
