= Kapsalon =

Dutch fast food dish

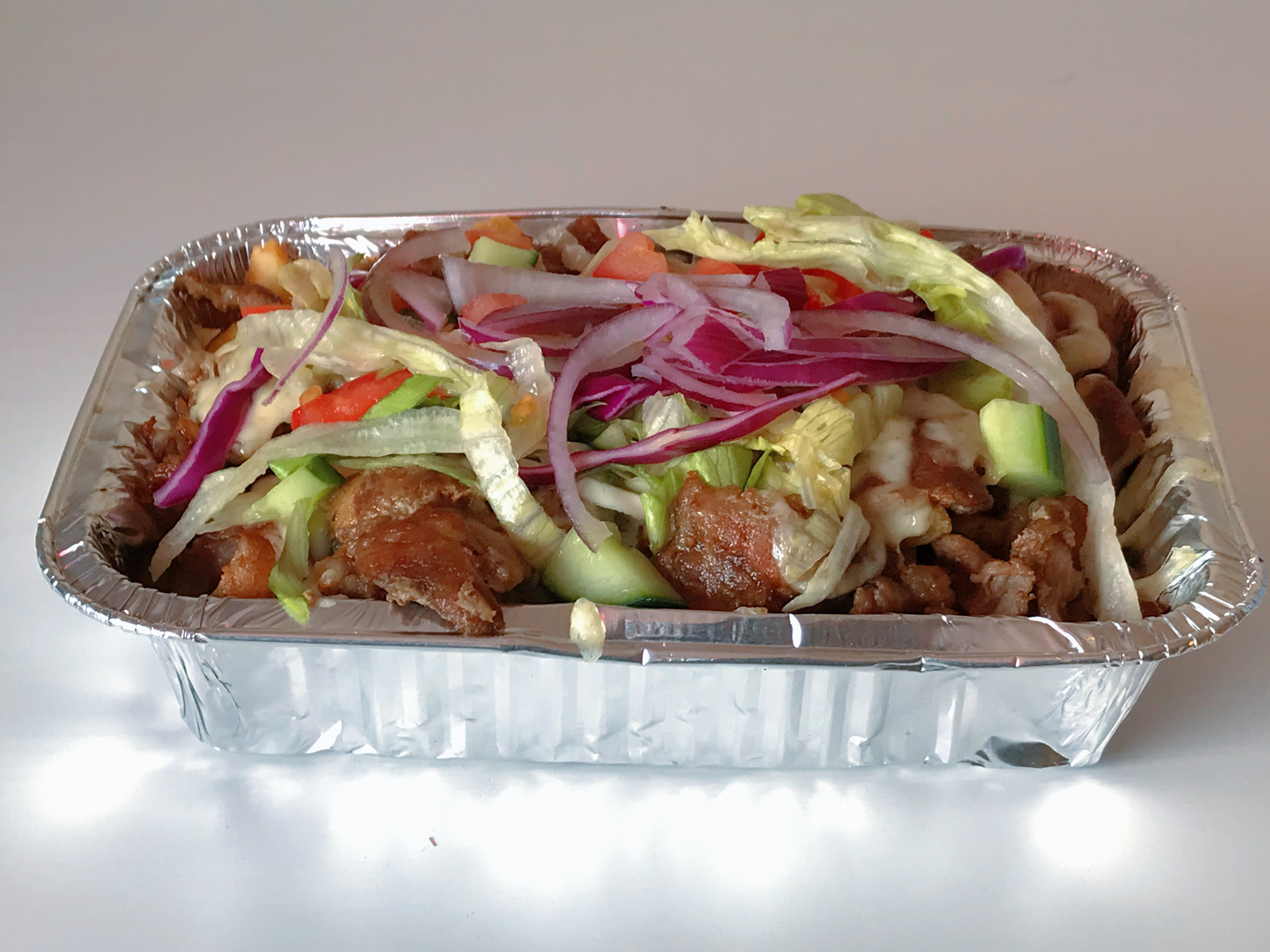
- A serving of Dutch Kapsalon
- Type: Fast food
- Place of origin: Netherlands
- Region or state: Rotterdam
- Created by: Nataniël ”Tati” Gomes
- Main ingredients: fries, meat (döner or gyros), Gouda cheese, salad vegetables

Kapsalon (Dutch pronunciation: [ˈkɑpsaːˌlɔn]) is a fast food dish created in 2003 in Rotterdam, Netherlands. It consists of a layer of french fries placed into a disposable metal take-away tray, topped with döner meat, covered with slices of Gouda cheese, and heated in an oven until the cheese melts. Then a layer of shredded iceberg lettuce is added, dressed with garlic sauce and sambal, a hot sauce. The term kapsalon is Dutch for "hairdressing salon" or a barber shop, alluding to the inventor's place of work. The dish is a product of Dutch multiculturalism, combining elements of dishes from multiple cultures, and quickly found its way on the Dutch fast-food menu. The dish also has spread internationally in a relatively short time.

== Invention and spread ==
External videos
- The pinnacle of Dutch cuisine— 2022 short film on kapsalon history with interview of El Aviva owner Derwis Bengu and neighbouring hairdresser Nataniël Gomes

The dish was conceived in 2003 by Nataniël Gomes, who was a Cape Verdean hairdresser in the Rotterdam multicultural district of Delfshaven, who one day at the neighboring shoarma snack bar "El Aviva" asked to combine all his favorite ingredients into one dish. He began to regularly request what the restaurant called "the usual order for the kapsalon". Other customers noticed and started to order the kapsalon too, and it became a hit, soon being demanded in nearby snack bars. Gomes reached a measure of international popularity; he died in 2023, aged 47. Hundreds of people held a honour guard outside Gomes' hair salon to pay their last respects.

The dish has since spread around the Netherlands and into Belgium, and several other countries in at least three continents. In some places the shoarma meat may be replaced with chicken, or doner kebab meat. The kapsalon has been described as "a typical example of contemporary cultural heritage", and "representative of the transnational nature of the city", according to Paul van der Laar, urban historian and curator at the Museum Rotterdam. Rotterdam is a fundamentally multicultural city, says Van der Laar, and the kapsalon is a direct product of that blending, the result of different cultures and tastes merging together. For him, the dish is more than just a foil tray of fries and shoarma; it's a symbol of what it means to be from Rotterdam; a marker of the "Rotterdam identity".

The dish has also been described as a "calorie bomb" and "culinary lethal weapon", with high fat content and up to 1,800 kilocalories (7,500 kJ) in a large serving. Kapsalon is a standard menu item in Belgian döner restaurants, both in Flanders and Wallonia. Various Turkish restaurants throughout Germany serve the dish, especially in larger cities. The dish can be found in other cities throughout Europe as well, most Polish towns and cities (including Warsaw, Poznań and Kraków), in Prague, Czech Republic, in Saint Petersburg, Russia, cities in Latvia (including Riga, Jelgava, Jūrmala, Sigulda) in Oulu, Finland, and in Brașov, Romania. It has been found in Morocco and Cardiff in Wales as well.

The kapsalon reached the Nepalese capital city of Kathmandu in 2017, when a chef returning from a visit to the Netherlands was asked to prepare a "typically Dutch" meal. The Nepalese adaptation of kapsalon is served on a porcelain plate rather than a metal tray, and has a chicken or fish base in place of shawarma meat; it has become a fashionable dish, with many people posting photos and a prominent food blogger describing it as "a party in her mouth with her favorite tastes". In Vientiane, Laos, similar adaptations of the kapsalon have emerged, featuring alternatives such as tuna and beef to accommodate local culinary preferences.

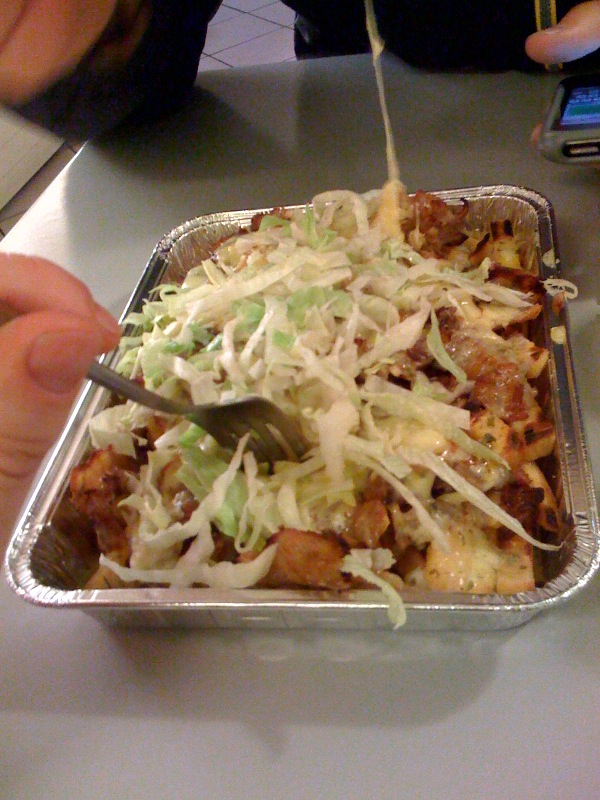
People sharing a kapsalon

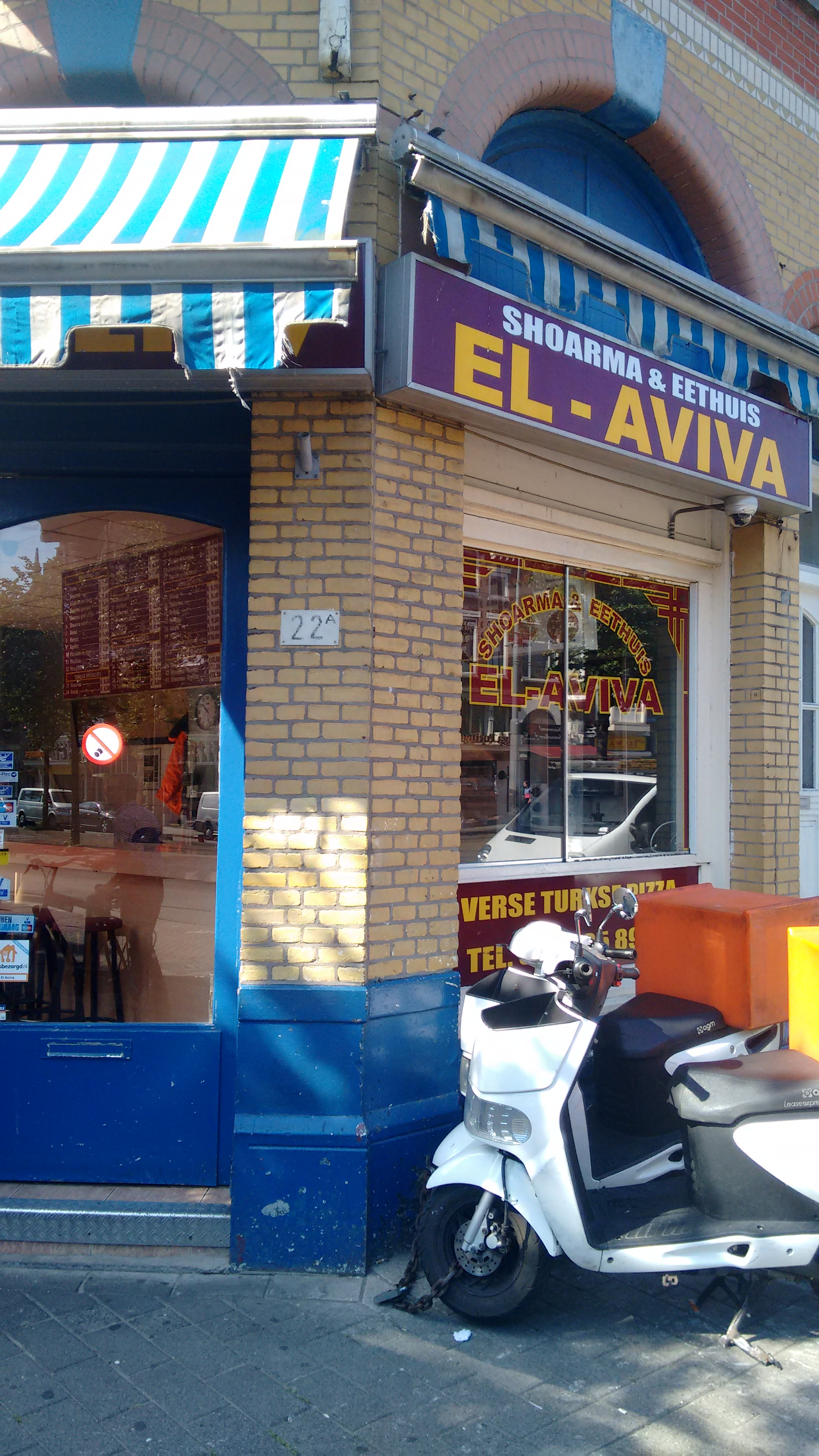
El-Aviva, where the kapsalon was created

== See also ==
- Turkish cuisine
- Carne asada fries – Dish originating from San Diego, U.S.
- Chorrillana – Chilean dish
- Halal snack pack – Australian halal dish
- Mitraillette – Belgian sandwich
- Poutine – Quebecois dish
- Revuelto Gramajo – Argentine potato and egg dish
- Yaroa – Dominican street food
- List of meat and potato dishes
