= Chicken balls =

Chicken meat shaped into a sphere

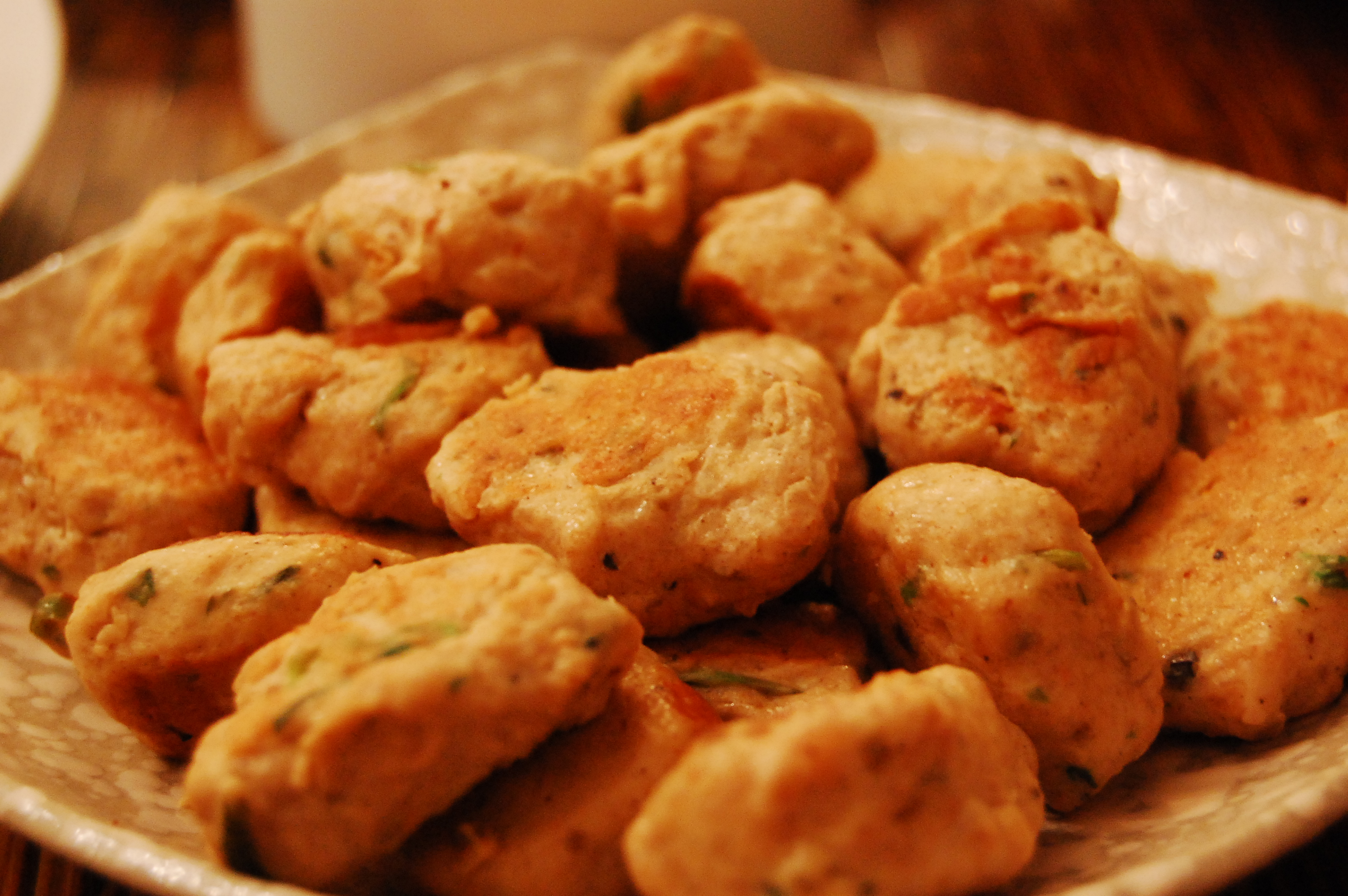
Garlic-chicken balls

Chicken balls are a food consisting of small, spherical or nearly spherical pieces of chicken. They are prepared and eaten in several different cuisines.

== In Western Chinese cuisine ==
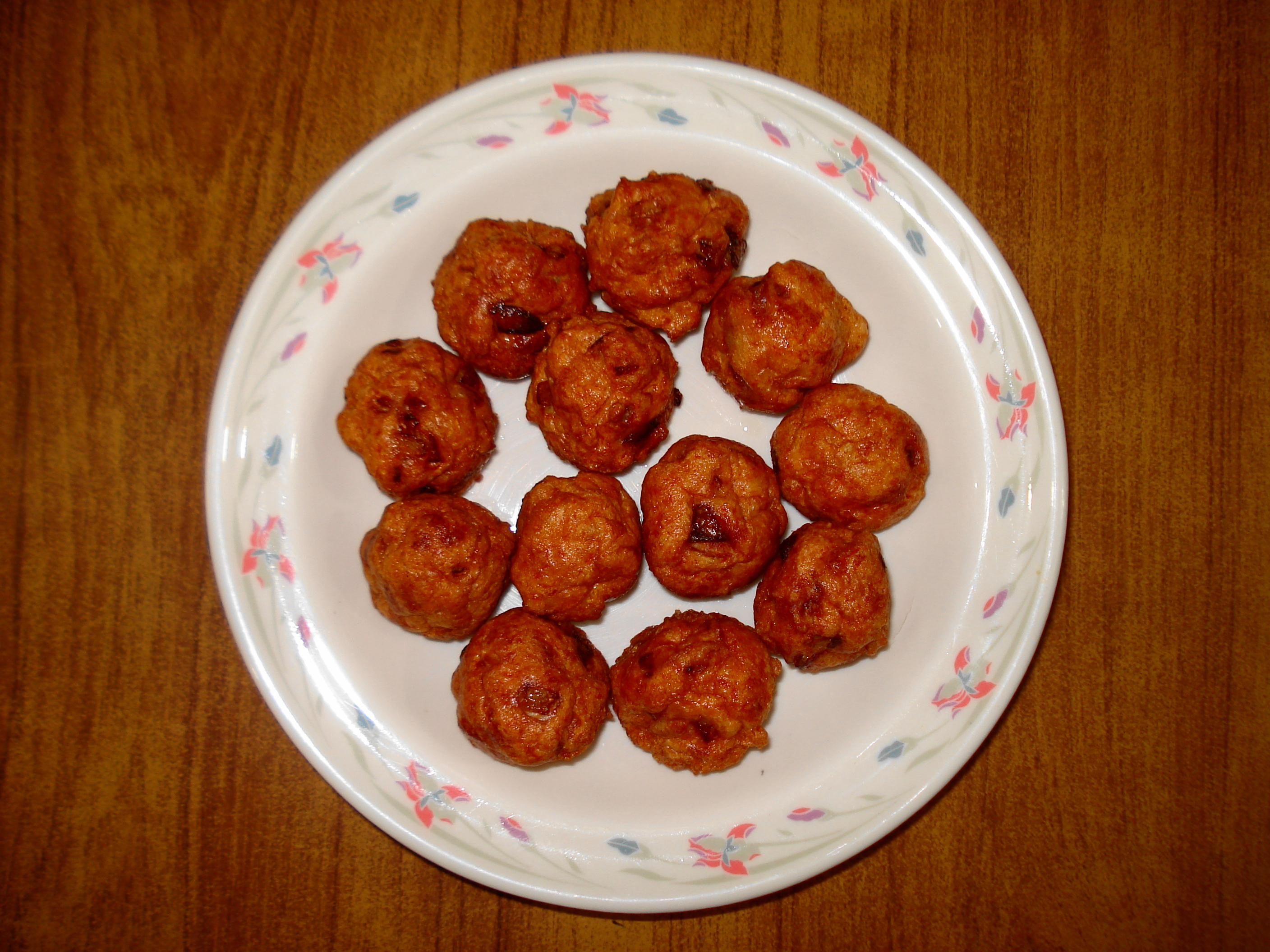
Chicken balls from a Chinese restaurant in Pakistan

Chicken balls (Chinese: 鸡球; pinyin: jī qiú) are a type of modern Chinese food served in Canada, the United States, the United Kingdom, and Ireland as a staple of Chinese takeaways. The dish consists of small chunks of fried chicken breast meat covered in a crispy batter coating. They are often served with curry sauce, sweet and sour sauce or plum sauce. These are largely unheard of in China, depending on the recipe and referred name.

== In East and Southeast Asian cuisines ==
Another kind of chicken balls, which are similar to southern Chinese fish balls, may be found in countries in East and Southeast Asia, such as the Philippines and Japan (tsukune).

== In other cuisines ==
Chicken balls are also a part of several other culinary traditions, including Italian Jewish cuisine and Islamic cuisine.

== See also ==
- British Chinese cuisine
- Canadian Chinese cuisine
- Chicken nugget
- Coxinha
