= La Banquise =

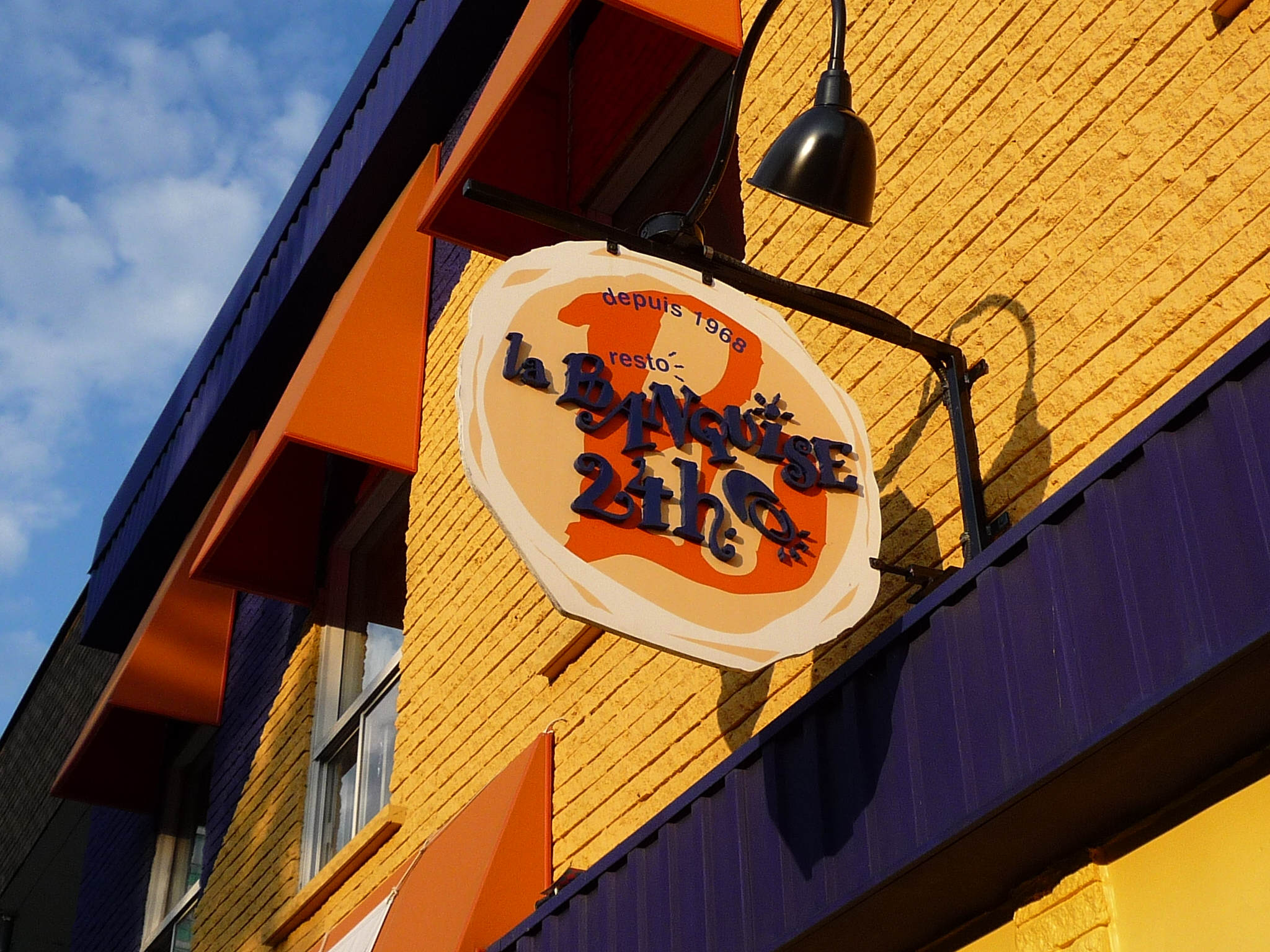
- La Banquise storefront

- Location within Montreal

Restaurant information
- Established: May 1968
- Food type: Snack bar specializing in Poutine
- Dress code: Casual
- Location: 994 Rue Rachel East, Montreal, Quebec, H2J 2J3, Canada
- Coordinates: 45.525318°N 73.574951°W
- Website: labanquise.com

La Banquise (French pronunciation: [la bɑ̃kiz]) is a restaurant in Montreal, Quebec, Canada which specializes in the dish of poutine. It serves over thirty different kinds of poutine and is open 24 hours. Its address is 994 Rue Rachel East in the borough of Le Plateau-Mont-Royal.

== History ==
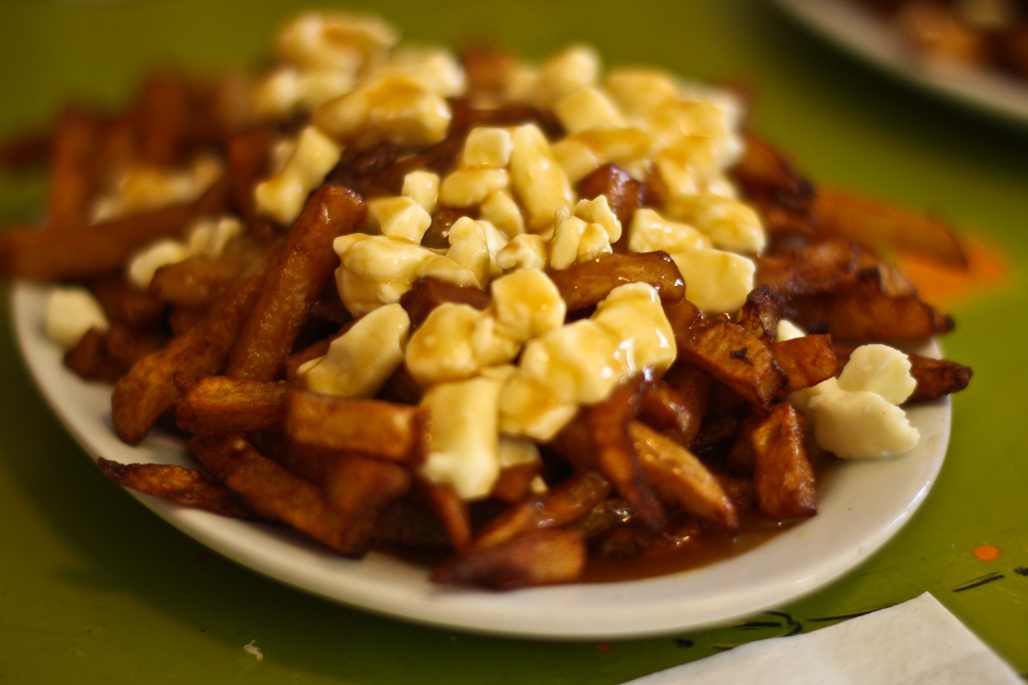
A Classic Poutine from La Banquise.

La Banquise was founded in 1968 by Pierre Barsalou, a firefighter. It was originally an ice cream shop, although it became a snack bar later in the year and served mostly hot dogs and French fries. Poutine was not served at La Banquise until the beginning of the 1980s. Only two types of poutine were served at the beginning, although La Banquise is now known for serving over 30 different varieties. From 1994 to 2023 the restaurant was owned by Barsalou's daughter Annie and her husband Marc Latendresse.

As of November, 2023 the current owners of the restaurant are Jean-Christophe Lirette and Émily Adam of the Restaurant Chain Ashton.

== Reception ==
On his television program, No Reservations, American chef Anthony Bourdain recommended La Banquise as one of his favourite meals in Montreal.

In the Montreal Mirror's Best of Montreal Readers Poll 2011, La Banquise won the title of Best Late Night Eat in addition to Best Poutine.

Ryan Smolkin developed the Smoke's Poutinerie chain after being inspired by La Banquise. Smolkin frequented La Banquise whenever he visited Montreal.
