= La Poutine Week =

Canadian annual food festival

- Status: Active
- Genre: Food festival, food tour and competition
- Frequency: Annually, 1–7 February
- Inaugurated: 1 February 2013
- Founders: Na'eem Adam; Thierry Rassam
- Most recent: 1–7 February 2026
- Next event: 1–7 February 2027
- Participants: 800 restaurants
- Attendance: 325,000
- Major events: Creating and consuming poutine
- Organizer: People Mover Technologies
- Website: www.lapoutineweek.com

La Poutine Week is an annual food festival which celebrates poutine, a Québécois dish of french fries, cheddar cheese curds and brown gravy, which is popular throughout Canada and has spread internationally. It is the world's largest poutine festival, with over 700 restaurants serving poutines to more than 350,000 customers. The festival has been held 1–7 February, (Note: Double-sized editions of the festival were held 1–14 February in 2022 and 2023, before returning to a one-week event.) most recently in 2026.

== Background and organization ==
La Poutine Week was conceived by marketing entrepreneur Na'eem Adam and lawyer Thierry Rassam. They were introduced by friends at a restaurant where they had a spirited debate about who made Montreal's best hamburger. Adam was then writing a food blog and brought the question to his readers to seek more opinions. Adam and Thierry developed upon the interest to launch the first Le Burger Week food festival in September 2012, to let the public decide. Building on the success of Le Burger Week, Adam and Thierry used the same model to launch La Poutine Week in February 2013. They founded the company People Mover Technologies to organize both festivals. (Note: Adam and Thierry created company People Mover Technologies to organize Le Burger Week. It subsequently organized La Poutine Week and Le Pizza Week.)

La Poutine Week is held annually, 1–7 February. The dates were chosen to help attract winter customers when restaurants entered a slow business period between New Year's and Valentine's Day. Participating restaurants create a signature poutine, priced at no more than $10. (Note: Prices outside Canada may vary.) Restaurants in each city or region compete for Favourite Poutine, decided by an online vote from the eating public, and the Jury Prize, Health Prize, Most Original Poutine and Most Outrageous Poutine. (Note: Most Outrageous Poutine has occasionally been awarded by judges for a dish which pushes the boundaries of excess, such as a large hamburger which contained a poutine.) In 2025, People for the Ethical Treatment of Animals (PETA) gave awards for the best vegan poutine. Judges for each city receive La Poutine Week merchandise and a cash stipend. According to Adam, the festival grew naturally, with restaurants eager to take part.

The first La Poutine Week was held in Montreal in 2013, with 30 restaurants participating. The following year, the festival expanded to Quebec City, Ottawa and Toronto, with about 100 restaurants in total. In 2015, over 120 restaurants took part, with Sherbrooke, Quebec, added as a competing city and international participation in Brooklyn, New York, and Wollongong, Australia. In 2016, the international contingent expanded with additional restaurants in Australia and the United States, as well as Argentina, Brazil, England, France, and New Zealand. In 2018, the festival comprised 240 restaurants across nine Canadian cities, adding Vancouver, Edmonton, Regina and Winnipeg. Also that year, Winnipeg overtook Montreal with in excess of 80 participating restaurants.

The decentralized nature and social media aspects of La Poutine Week (and its sister festivals) effectively protected it during the COVID-19 pandemic, in comparison to traditional food festivals which physically attract attendees together into a large crowd. In 2021, with sponsorship from Montreal-based multinational dairy Saputo Inc., entry fees were waived or greatly reduced, encouraging more restaurants to take part, while SkipTheDishes provided free delivery which was essential in areas with curfews or dine-in restrictions. Some restaurants also developed packaging that allowed customers to assemble their poutine on arrival, preserving the dynamics of the contrasting ingredients. 700 restaurants across 8 Canadian provinces participated in La Poutine Week 2021, and Montreal reclaimed top position with over 120 restaurants. Some 350,000 customers took part, making it the largest poutine festival in the world. One dollar from each poutine sold was donated to charities, such as Anorexie et Boulimie Québec (ANEB).

For its tenth year, La Poutine Week was held 1 to 14 February 2022. The double-sized edition was intended to allow the eating public the opportunity to try more poutines from the large number of participating restaurants. This continued in 2023, before returning to a one-week format in 2024. That year, participation grew to more than 800 restaurants.

== Dishes ==
Restaurants are free to create any kind of poutine for the festival. According to Adam, the popular poutines in Montreal are those which perfect the core ingredients of french fries, cheddar cheese curds and brown gravy, while in the "poutine diaspora" it has been more about reinventing the dish. Some chefs take inspiration with a combination of carbs, cheese and sauce, while others distance themselves further with solid, semisolid and liquid elements. Many will create fusions with other cuisines, and there are often vegetarian, breakfast and dessert poutines.

IBM supercomputer Watson helped a team of chefs create five new poutines for free taste-testing during La Poutine Week 2015 in Toronto and Montreal. It analyzed the demographics and popular cuisines of the cities and drew from a database of tens of thousands of recipes to create fusion pairings for each city.

== Reception ==
Susan Semenak of the Montreal Gazette described La Poutine Week as "Montreal's greasiest festival" and a "grease and gravy marathon". Tiffany Le of the McGill Tribune called it the best winter undertaking for foodies. Rita Demontis of the Toronto Sun called the dishes "wild and wonderful ... with every known food group playing a role."

== Impact ==
The festival has helped restaurants to stay open and boost sales during difficult periods. The festival also raises morale and triggers rehiring to meet the increased demand. According to organizers, some restaurants have had their best week of business during the festival or ran out of food to serve. Dairies experience increased curd sales for La Poutine Week and raise curd production in anticipation of the festival.

While celebrating poutine, organizers have made an effort to communicate that it is not an everyday food. (Note: Writing for the New York Times, dietician Elaine Magee ranked poutine as the least-healthy french fry based dish.) In addition to the juried prize for the Healthiest Poutine, gym memberships and other health-related prizes have been given to those who register votes and funds have been donated to health-related charities.

The success of Le Burger Week and La Poutine Week led to the launch of Le Pizza Week in May 2021. Adam and Thierry had earlier held back due to the number of other pizza festivals, but during the pandemic they received a number of requests from restaurants and understood that there was demand.
