= Leopold's Tavern =

Canadian bar and fast casual restaurant chain

- Type: Private
- Industry: Bar and Fast Casual Restaurant
- Founded: 2013; 13 years ago Regina, Saskatchewan, Canada
- Headquarters: Regina, Saskatchewan, Canada
- Number of locations: 29
- Area served: Canada
- Parent: Leo's Hospitality Group
- Website: leopoldstavern.com

Leopold's Tavern is a Canadian bar and fast casual restaurant chain founded in Regina, Saskatchewan.

Leopold's serves alcoholic and non-alcoholic beverages like a selection of craft beer along with a food menu that includes tacos, chicken wings and poutine.

The chain opened its original Regina location in 2013. The bar is named after Leopold George Duncan Albert, the eighth child of Queen Victoria and Prince Albert.

Leopold's began its expansion outside of Regina in 2016 with the opening of a Saskatoon location. The chain has since expanded throughout western Canada into Alberta, British Columbia and Manitoba.

Each location takes a dive bar approach to decor and atmosphere with local artifacts decorating the walls. Customers are encouraged to add their own decorations if space allows.
