= Poutine =

Quebecois dish

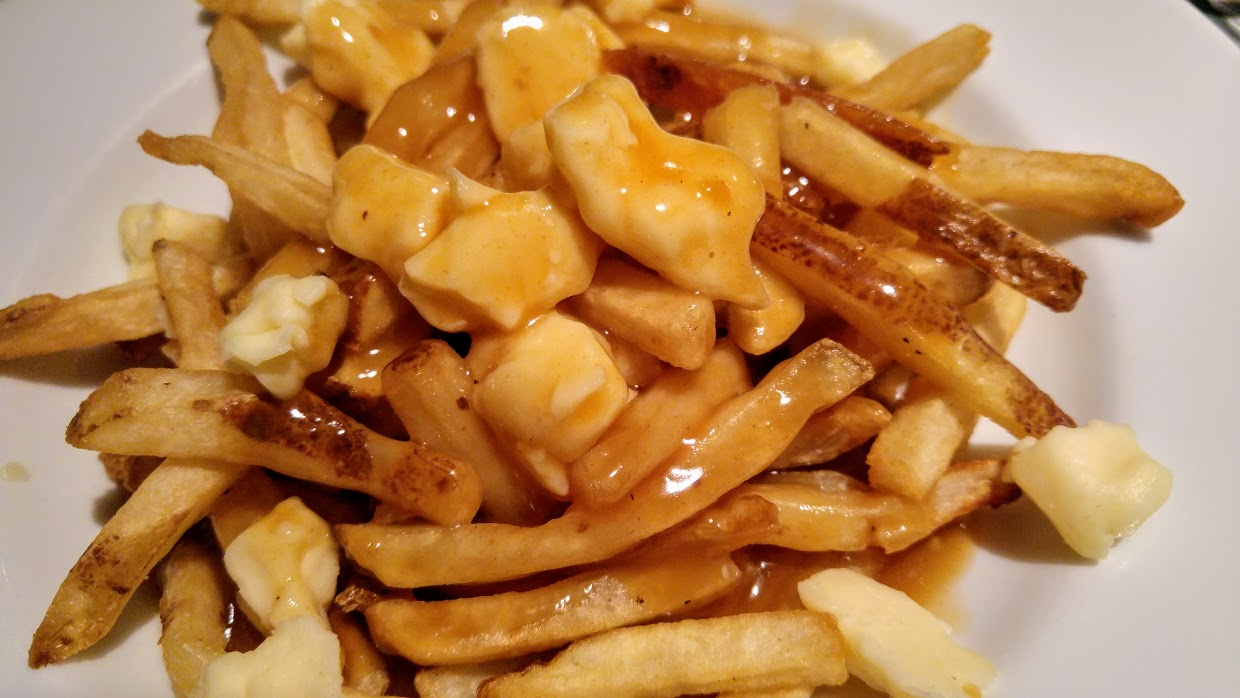
- A serving of poutine from Montreal, Quebec
- Course: Main course or side dish
- Place of origin: Canada
- Region or state: Quebec
- Created by: Many claims
- Invented: Late 1950s
- Main ingredients: French fries, gravy, cheese curds

Poutine (Note: Quebec French: [puˈt͡sɪn], France French [putin]) is a dish of French fries and cheese curds topped with a hot brown beef and chicken stock gravy. It emerged in the Centre-du-Québec region of Quebec in 1959, though its exact origins are uncertain, and there are several competing claims regarding its origin. For many years, it was used by some to mock Quebec society. Poutine later became celebrated as a symbol of Québécois culture and the province of Quebec. It has long been associated with Quebec cuisine, and its rise in prominence has led to its growing popularity throughout the rest of Canada.

Annual poutine celebrations occur in Montreal, Quebec City, and Drummondville, as well as Toronto, Ottawa, New Hampshire, and Chicago. It has been called Canada's national dish, though some critics believe this labeling represents cultural appropriation of the Québécois or Quebec national identity. Many variations on the original recipe are popular, leading some to suggest that poutine has emerged as a new dish classification in its own right, as with sandwiches or dumplings.

== History ==
=== Origins ===
The dish was created in the Centre-du-Québec area in the late 1950s. Several restaurants in the area claim to be the originators of the dish, but no consensus exists.

- Le Lutin qui rit, Warwick – Restaurateur Fernand Lachance of Le Café Idéal (later Le Lutin qui rit), is said to have exclaimed in 1957, "ça va faire une maudite poutine!" (English: "It will make a damn mess!") when asked by a regular to put a handful of cheese curds in a take-out bag of french fries. The dish "poutine" appears on the establishment's 1957 menu. Lachance served this on a plate, and beginning in 1962 added hot gravy to keep it warm.
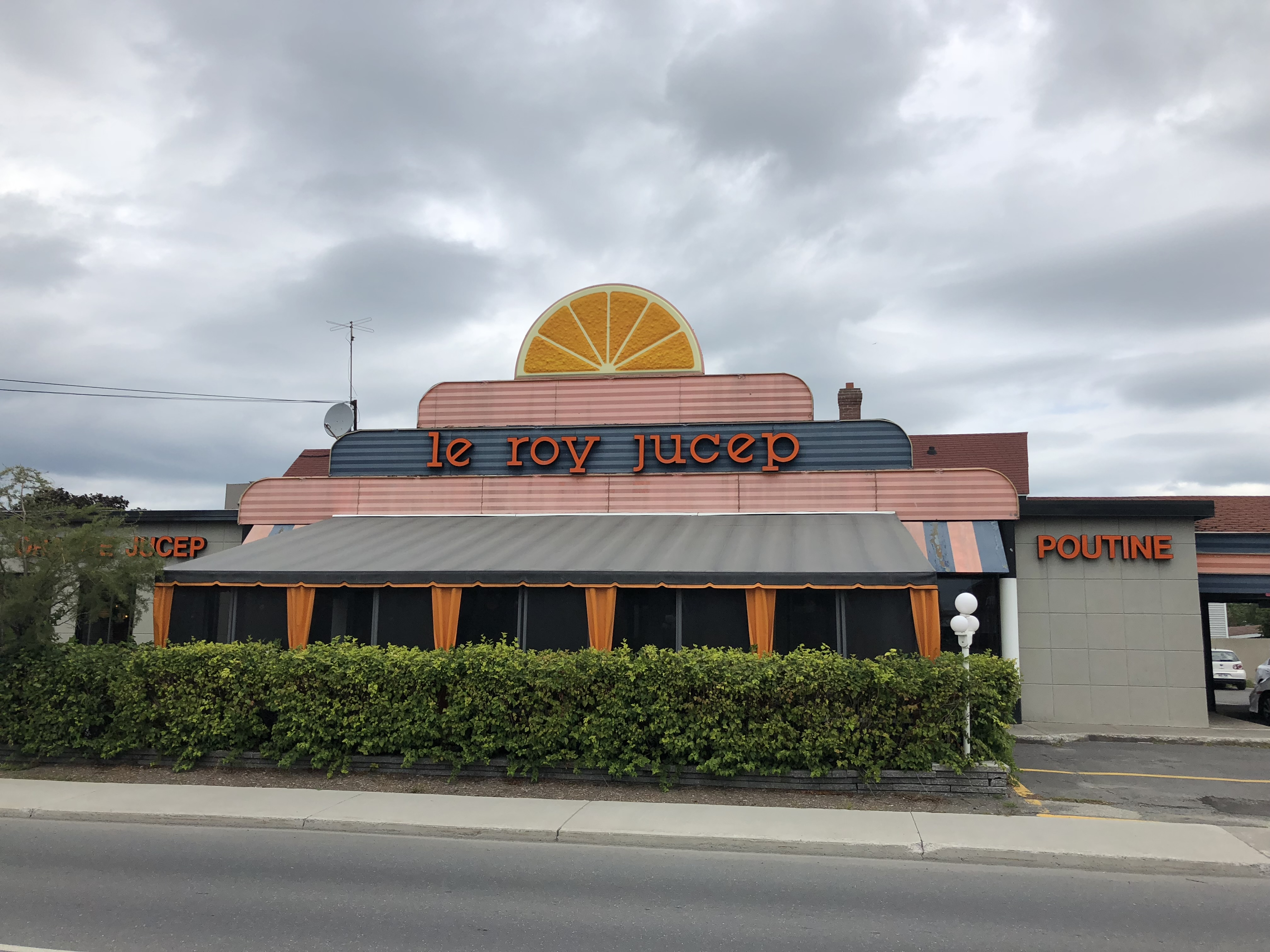
- Le Roy Jucep in 2018
  Le Roy Jucep, Drummondville – This drive-in restaurant served french fries with gravy, to which some customers would add a side order of cheese curds. Owner Jean-Paul Roy began serving the combination in 1958 and added it to the menu in 1964 as "fromage-patate-sauce". Felt to be too long a name, this was later changed to poutine for a cook nicknamed "Ti-Pout" and a slang word for "pudding". (Note: The dish was originally called fromage-patate-sauce (cheese-fries-gravy) but this proved too long to put on the menu. According to Renée Brousseau, the general manager of Le Roy Jucep, the drive-in's servers demanded a name for the popular dish to facilitate taking orders from curbside to kitchen. They said "Ti-Pout makes the pudding", using the nickname of a cook and pouding, the slang word they used for strange combinations of food. Brousseau stated that this was how they came up with 'poutine'.) The restaurant displays a copyright registration certificate, issued by the Canadian Intellectual Property Office, which alludes to Roy having invented poutine.
- La Petite Vache, Princeville – Customers would mix cheese curds with their fries, a combination which was added to the menu. One option included gravy and was called the "Mixte".

According to Canadian gastronomy researcher Sylvain Charlebois, while Warwick is the birthplace of poutine, Drummondville's Jean-Paul Roy is the true inventor since Le Roy Jucep was the first to sell poutine with three combined ingredients, in 1964. The Oxford Companion to Cheese takes a different perspective, stating that the inventors were not chefs but the customers who chose to add cheese curds to their fries.

=== Development ===
Poutine was consumed in small "greasy spoon" diners (commonly known in Quebec as cantines or casse-croûtes), pubs, at roadside chip wagons (commonly known as cabanes à patates, literally "potato shacks"), and in ice hockey arenas. For decades, it remained a country snack food in Quebec's dairy region, due to the brief period in which freshly made cheddar cheese curds retain their characteristic soft, squeaky texture. (Note: Cheese curds are also known as "squeaky cheese". The fresher the curds, the louder they squeak when chewed. In The Wall Street Journal, Adam Leith Gollner described chewing fresh curds as "like a rusty doorhinge swinging open between your teeth". Those from the Centre-du-Québec region do not consider a poutine authentic if it does not squeak.) In 1969, poutine was brought to Quebec City in Ashton Leblond's food truck (a business which grew into the Chez Ashton fast-food chain). In the early 1970s, La Banquise began serving poutine in Montreal, followed by the Burger King chain in 1983. Others that followed used inferior cheese and the dish's reputation declined. Poutine was largely perceived as an unsophisticated backwoods creation or unhealthy junk food to be consumed after a night of drinking.

Montreal chefs would make poutine to feed their staff but had not dared to put it on their menus. In the 1990s, attempts were made to elevate the dish by using baked potatoes and duck stock. In November 2001, Martin Picard of bistro Au Pied de Cochon began serving a foie gras poutine which was praised by customers and food critics. This influenced chefs in Toronto and Vancouver to feature poutine on upscale menus. Chef Mark McEwan served lobster poutine at his Bymark eatery, and chef Jamie Kennedy served braised beef poutine at his eponymous restaurant. Over the next decade, poutine gained acceptance and popularity in all types of restaurants, from haute cuisine to fast food, and spread across Canada and internationally. Poutine became extremely trendy in the early 2010s, with an explosion of poutineries in cities like Toronto, leading to stories about poutine's association with romance and events like the IBM Watson Cognitive Cooking Poutine Event, where the computer generated unique poutine recipes based on the demographics of Toronto and Montreal.

=== Etymology ===
The Dictionnaire historique du français québécois lists 15 meanings of poutine in Québécois and Acadian French, most of which are for kinds of food; the word poutine in the meaning "fries with cheese and gravy" is dated to 1982 in English. Other senses of the word have been in use since at least 1810.

According to Merriam-Webster, a popular etymology is that poutine is from a Québécois slang word meaning "mess", and that others attribute it to the English word pudding. The exact provenance of the word poutine is uncertain.

The Dictionnaire historique mentions the possibility that the form poutine is simply a gallicization of the word pudding. However, it considers it more likely that the term was inherited from regional languages in France, with some meanings shaped later by the influence of the similarly sounding English word pudding. It cites the Provençal forms poutingo "bad stew" and poutité "hodgepodge" or "crushed fruit or foods"; poutringo "mixture of various things" in Languedocien; and poutringue or potringa "bad stew" in Franche-Comté as possibly related to poutine. The meaning "fries with cheese and gravy" of poutine is among those held as probably unrelated to pudding, provided the latter view is correct.

== Recipe ==
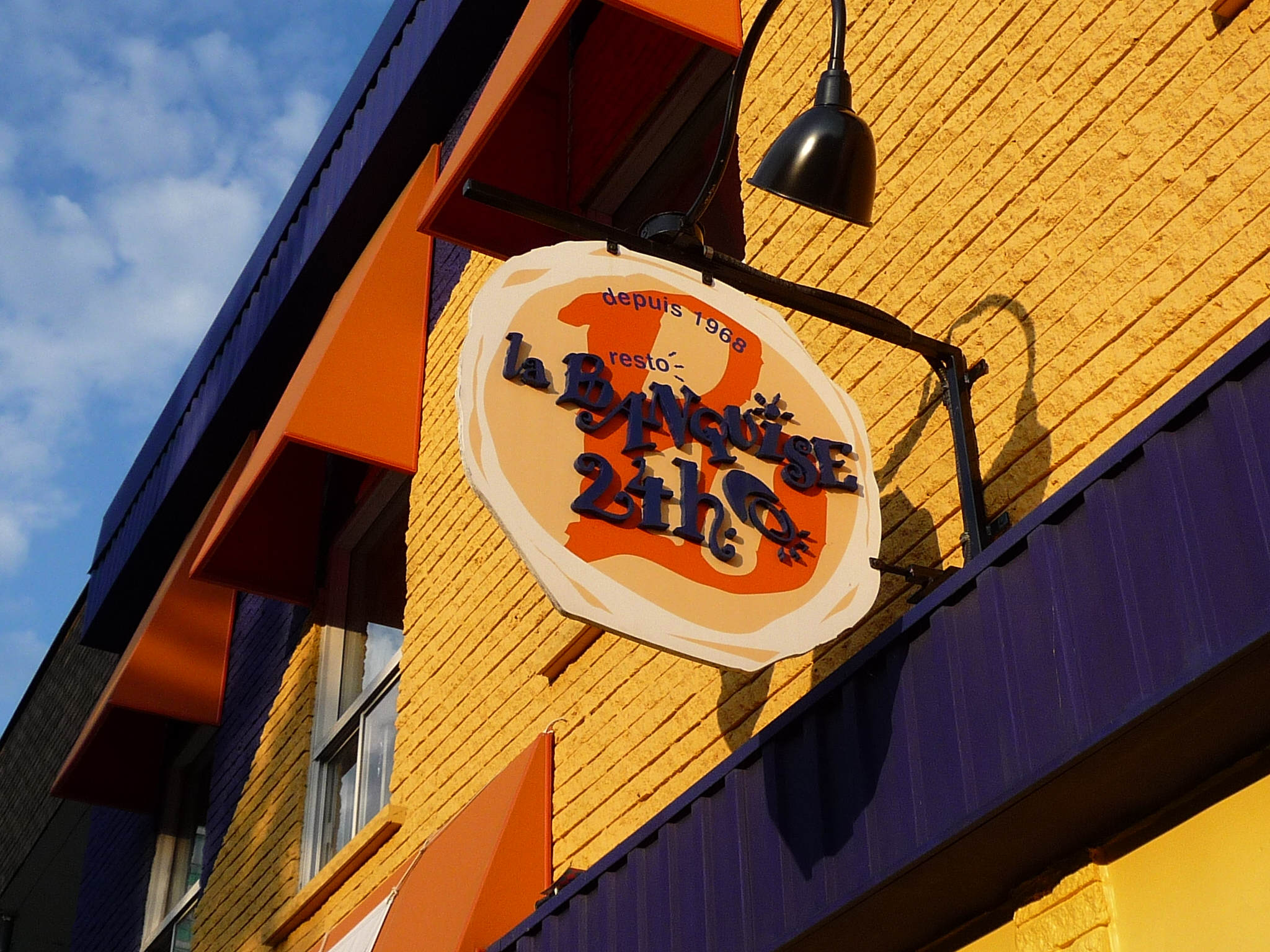
La Banquise, a poutinerie in Montreal, serves more than thirty varieties of poutine.

The traditional recipe for poutine consists of:

- French fries: These are usually of medium thickness and fried (sometimes twice) such that the inside stays soft, while the outside is crispy.
- Cheese curds: Fresh cheese curds are used to give the desired texture. The curd size varies, as does the amount used.
- Brown gravy: Traditionally, it is a light and thin beef or chicken gravy, somewhat salty and mildly spiced with a hint of pepper; or a sauce brune, which is a combination of chicken and beef stock. Poutine sauces (French: mélange à sauce poutine) are sold in Quebec, Ontario, and Maritime grocery stores in jars or cans and in powdered mix packets; some grocery chains offer their own house-brand versions. Many stores and restaurants also offer vegetarian gravy. (Note: Brown gravy, as Americans use the term – consisting of flour, butter, ketchup, mustard, Worcestershire sauce, and beef broth – is not an appropriate substitute for proper sauce brune.)

To maintain the texture of the fries, the cheese curds and gravy are added immediately before serving the dish. The hot gravy is usually poured over room-temperature cheese curds, so they are warmed without melting completely. The thin gravy allows all the fries to be coated. The serving dish typically has some depth to act as a basket for the fries so that they retain their heat. It is important to control the temperature, timing, and the order in which the ingredients are added to obtain the right food textures—an essential part of the experience of eating poutine.

Freshness and juiciness of the curds is essential. Air and moisture seep out of the curds over time, altering their acidity level. This causes proteins to lose their elasticity, and the curds to lose their complex texture and characteristic squeaky sound when chewed. The curds should be less than a day old, which requires proximity to a dairy. While Montreal is 60 kilometres (37 mi) from a cheese plant in Mirabel, restaurants and specialty cheese shops outside of dairy regions may be unable to sell enough curds to justify the expense of daily deliveries. Furthermore, Canadian food safety practices require curds to be refrigerated within 24 hours, which suppresses the properties of their texture. This has resulted in poutineries which specialize in the dish; busy poutineries may use 100 kilograms (220 lb) of curds per day. Poutineries which are too distant from dairies may make their own cheese curds on site, in batches every few hours, to ensure a fresh and steady supply.

=== Variations ===
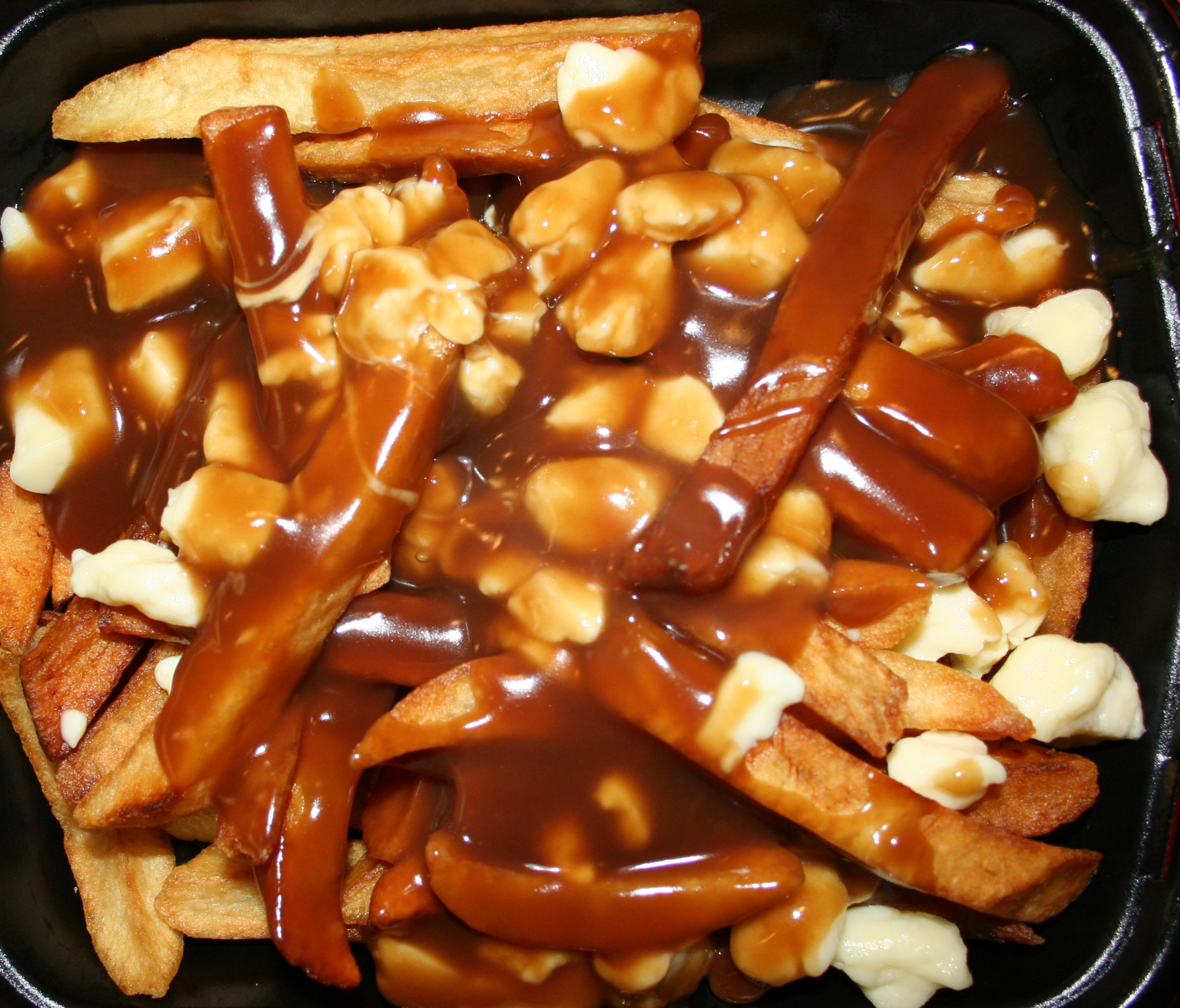
Poutine made with thick beef gravy on french-fried potatoes with fresh cheese curds is a style commonly found outside Quebec.

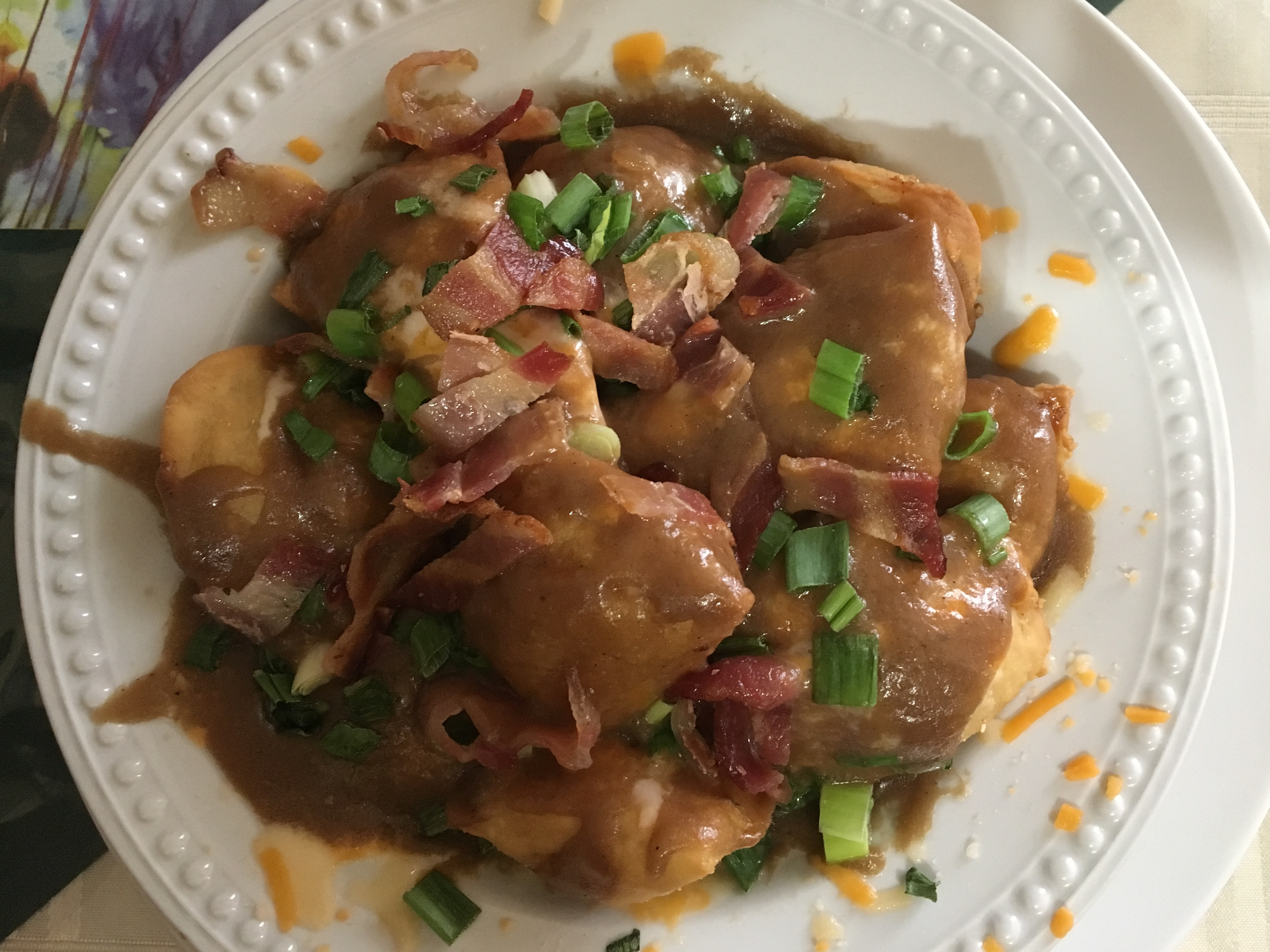
Polish-inspired poutine with pierogi instead of French fries

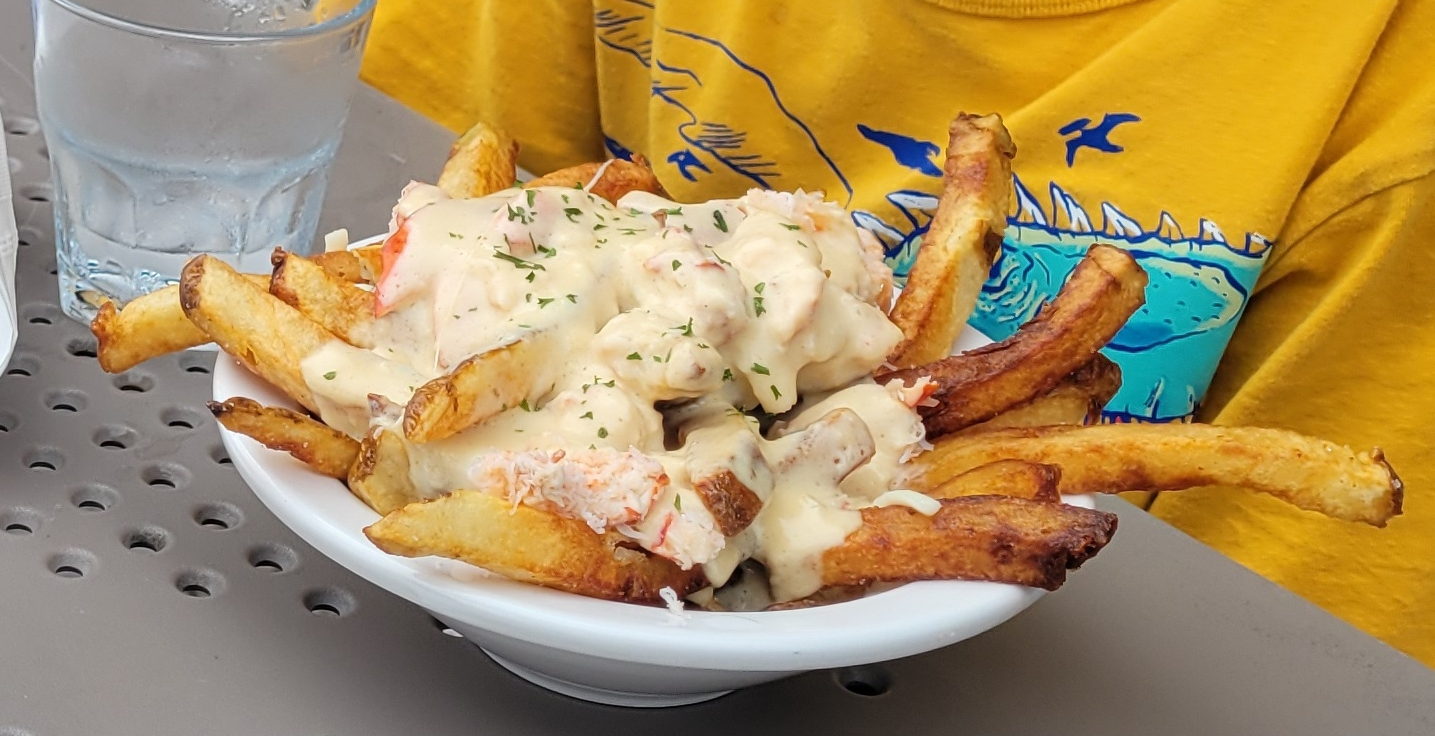
Lobster poutine in Dartmouth, Nova Scotia

The texture, temperature and viscosity of poutine's ingredients differ and continuously change as the food is consumed, making it a dish of highly dynamic contrasts. Strengthening these contrasts, superior poutines are identified by the crispiness of the fries, freshness of the curds, and a unifying gravy. Even small variations in ingredients or preparation—the oil used for frying, the origin of the curds, or spices in the gravy—can result in a distinctly different experience of eating the poutine.

Some recipes eliminate the cheese, but most Québécois would call such a dish a frite sauce (English: french fries with gravy), not poutine. When curds are unavailable, mozzarella cheese may be an acceptable alternative. Shredded mozzarella is commonly used in Saskatchewan. Sweet potato may be used as a healthier alternative to french fries, adding more dietary fibre and vitamins.

Poutineries, like Montreal's La Banquise, which is credited for much of the innovation and popularization of poutine, have dozens of varieties of poutine on their menus. Many of these are based on the traditional recipe with an added meat topping such as sausage, chicken, bacon, brisket, or Montreal-style smoked meat, with the gravy adjusted for balance. The Quebec City–based chain Chez Ashton is known for its poutine Galvaude (topped with chicken and green peas) and Dulton (with ground beef). New variations are frequently introduced. Pulled pork was popular around 2013, followed a couple years later by Asian-fusion poutines.

Montreal's high immigrant population has led to many takes on the dish inspired by other cuisines, such as Haitian, Mexican, Portuguese, Indian, Japanese, Greek, Italian and Lebanese. These poutines may bear little resemblance to the traditional recipe. They replace some or all of the ingredients but maintain the dynamic contrasts of textures and temperatures with a crispy element, a dairy or dairy-like element, and a unifying sauce. Many variations on the original recipe are popular, leading some to suggest that poutine has emerged as a new dish classification in its own right, as with sandwiches, dumplings, soups, and flatbreads.

Poutineries will frequently offer limited-time promotional specials, such as a Thanksgiving poutine with turkey, stuffing and cranberry sauce. In anticipation of the legalization of cannabis in Canada, Montreal's Le Gras Dur served a "pot poutine" with a gravy that included hemp protein, hemp seeds and hemp oil, offered with a joint-like roll of turkey, wild mushrooms and arugula.

Gourmet poutine with three-pepper sauce, merguez sausage, foie gras or caviar and truffle can be found. This is a trend that began in the 1990s and is credited to David McMillan of Montreal's Joe Beef and Globe restaurants. Savoury sauces like Moroccan harissa, lobster sauce, and red-wine veal jus have been used to complement artisanal cheeses and rich ingredients.

Chains such as Smoke's Poutinerie, New York Fries, McDonald's, Wendy's, A&W, KFC, Burger King, Harvey's, Mary Brown's, Arby's, and Wahlburgers restaurants also sell versions of poutine in Quebec and the rest of Canada (although not always country-wide). Tim Hortons began selling poutine in 2018. Fast-food combination meals in Canada often have the options to have french fries "poutinized" by adding cheese curds and gravy, or substituting a poutine for a fries side.

=== Internationally ===
Poutine is found in the northern border regions of the United States, including New England and the larger Northeast, the Pacific Northwest, and the Upper Midwest. These regions offer further variations of the basic dish, usually by utilizing cheeses other than fresh curds, which are not widely available in the US. In the country culture, a mixed fry can also come with cooked ground beef on top and is referred to as a hamburger mix, though this is less popular than a regular mix. In the Pacific Northwest, one variation replaces the gravy with chowder featuring local seafood.

Disco fries, french fries typically covered in mozzarella cheese and brown gravy, were popularized in New Jersey in the 1990s. They gained their name in the 1970s for being a favourite of late-night diners, who often came from dancing at disco clubs. The dish is also popular in New Orleans including variations called Cajun poutine.

Poutine spread to the United Kingdom, Korea and Russia, where it has been referred to as "Raspoutine". The first poutinerie in Paris, La Maison de la Poutine, opened in 2017 and quickly gained attention from mainstream media and gastronomers.

A similar dish known as chips, cheese and gravy, consisting of thick-cut chips covered in shredded Manx Cheddar cheese and topped with a thick beef gravy, is popular in the Isle of Man.

== Cultural aspects ==
A cultural marker, poutine had long been Quebec's adored junk food before spreading across the rest of Canada and the United States. It had by then made inroads with food critics and established culinary circles, challenging its junk food status. Food critic Jacob Richler noted in 2012 that Canadian dishes are too similar to their European roots to be considered original, with the exception of poutine, which he credited as the country's most famous culinary creation. In May 2014, the word "poutine" was added to the Merriam-Webster Dictionary of the English language.

In 2007, the Canadian Broadcasting Corporation declared the results of an online survey on the greatest Canadian inventions, in which poutine ranked at No. 10. Maclean's 2017 survey of "favourite iconic Canadian food" placed poutine first with 21% of respondents, ahead of maple syrup with 14%. By 2011, media outlets were reporting 11 April as National Poutine Day.

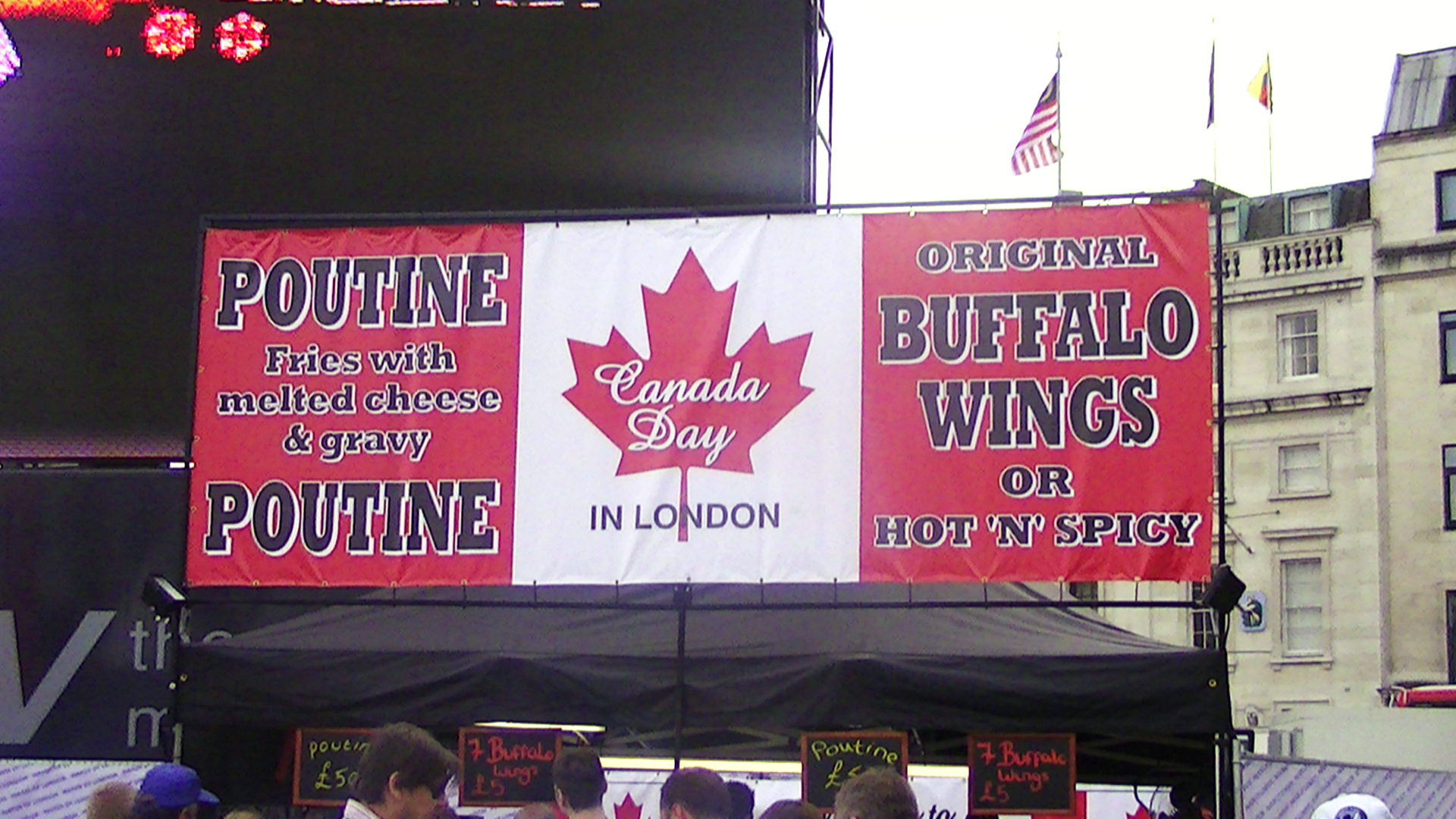
A poutine stand sign styled as the Flag of Canada during Canada Day celebrations in Trafalgar Square

In March 2016, poutine was served at the White House during the first state dinner hosted by President Barack Obama and Canada's Prime Minister Justin Trudeau. Poutine has been a highlight of Canada Day celebrations in Trafalgar Square in London, England, for several years, and was a comfort food for the local community after the 2013 Lac-Mégantic rail disaster. It was served at the inaugural Canadian Comedy Awards.

The first poutine festival was held in Warwick, Quebec, in 1993. This annual event expanded to become the largest cheese festival in Canada. In 2014, it was moved to the larger town of Victoriaville. Montreal has hosted La Poutine Week, an annual festival, food tour, and competition held 1–7 February, since 2013. It spread across Canada and internationally, and by 2021 had become the largest poutine festival in the world, with over 700 restaurants serving more than 350,000 poutines. Le Grand Poutinefest is a poutine festival founded in 2015 which tours cities and towns in Quebec, operating most weekends from April to September. Poutine festivals are also held in Drummondville (since 2008), Ottawa-Gatineau, Toronto, Calgary, Vancouver, Moncton, Quebec City and Sherbrooke. In the US, major festivals have been held in Chicago, Illinois, Manchester, New Hampshire, Knoxville, Tennessee, Portland, Maine, Burlington, Vermont, and in Rhode Island.

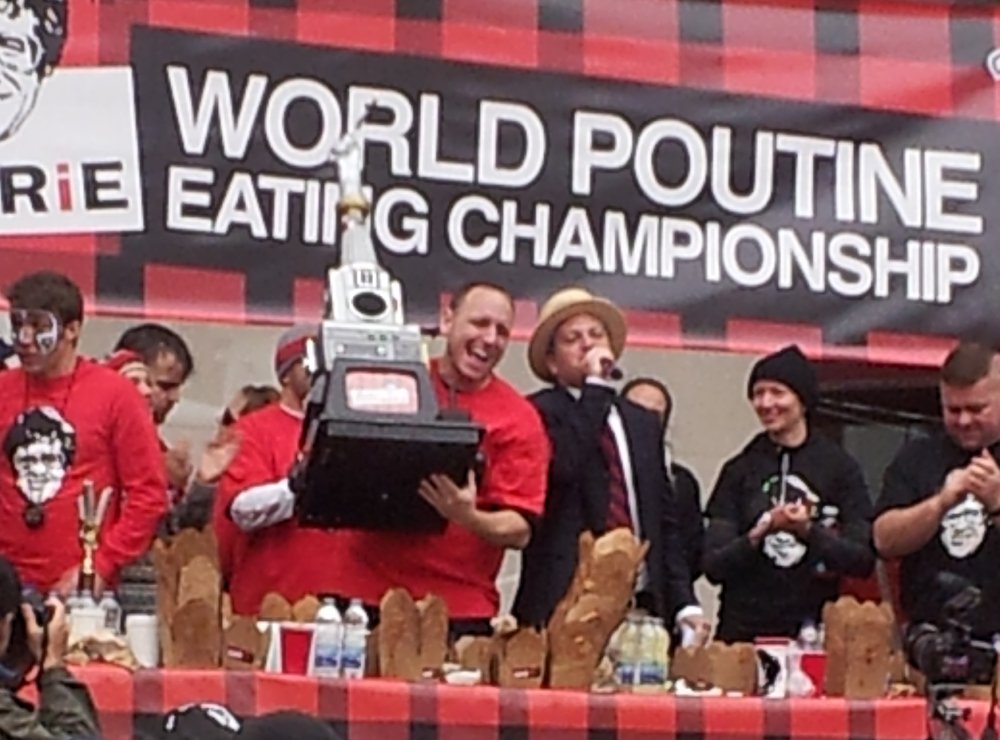
Joey Chestnut holds the trophy at the 2012 World Poutine Eating Championship in Toronto.

Since 2010, the International Federation of Competitive Eating (IFCE) has held a world poutine-eating championship sponsored by Toronto-based chain Smoke's Poutinerie. There was criticism that the inaugural contest was held outside of Quebec and excluded Québécois. The IFCE stated that Montreal poutineries had not expressed any interest in holding the competition. Regulations for contests in Quebec make it difficult to include the province, which is often absent from national contests. Smoke's has since sponsored a cross-Canada poutine eating tour. In 2011, chef Chuck Hughes won on Iron Chef America (episode 2 of season 9) by beating Bobby Flay with a plate of lobster poutine.

Jones Soda Co., an originally Canadian company now based in the US, created a poutine-flavoured limited-edition soft drink in 2013, which received international pop culture attention. Bacon-poutine was one of four flavours selected as a finalist in the 2014 Lay's Canada Do Us A Flavour potato chip contest. Though it did not win, Lay's later added a bacon-poutine variety in its Canada entry for the World Flavourites. Loblaws' President's Choice and Ruffles brands also offer poutine-flavoured potato chips in Canada. Giapos Ice Cream of New Zealand has served a "poutine ice cream" of oolong matcha tea, ice cream and caramel sauce over hand-cut fries since 2017. In a 2018 promotional campaign for the film Crazy Rich Asians, "the world's richest poutine" was created with wagyu steak, lobster, truffles, shiitake and chanterelle mushrooms, edible orchids, and gold flakes, priced just under $450.

Joel Edmundson, of the 2018–19 National Hockey League champion team St. Louis Blues, ate poutine from the Stanley Cup during celebrations attended by over 4,000 fans in his hometown of Brandon, Manitoba. Mathieu Joseph, a Chambly, Quebec, native who won the Cup with the Tampa Bay Lightning in 2020 and 2021, also ate poutine from the Cup during a celebration with the Cup in 2021.

== Nutrition ==
Health advocates have been critical of poutine since the 1980s. In a 2013 study of Canadian restaurants, poutine was found to have the second-highest sodium (1547 mg average and as high as 2227 mg) among single meal items, after stir-fry entrées.

== Social mobility and appropriation ==
The social status of poutine has evolved dramatically since its origins in rural Quebec in the 1950s. The dish was long mocked as a culinary invention and used as a means of stigmatization by non-Québécois against Quebec society to reduce its legitimacy. While the first generations that suffered from the poutine stigma opted to disidentify from the dish, younger people in Quebec began to reappropriate poutine as a symbol of Quebecois cultural pride. Today, the dish is celebrated in many annual poutine festivals in Quebec, the rest of Canada, and in the United States.

The evolution of the different symbols associated with poutine was first studied in Maudite Poutine! by Charles-Alexandre Théorêt. Théorêt revisited many of these stigmas in an interview given at Tout le monde en parle on 11 November 2007.

As poutine gained popularity beyond the provincial borders of Quebec in the mid-2000s, the dish gradually stopped being mocked and was eventually introduced into the popular discourse as a symbol of Canadian identity. Today, the dish is often presented as being a part of Canadian cuisine, even as Canada's national dish. Nicolas Fabien-Ouellet suggested in the peer-reviewed journal CuiZine that this "Canadization" of poutine constitutes cultural appropriation. (Note: Fabien-Ouellet has given many talks about the Canadianization and cultural appropriation of poutine, notably in The New York Times, National Post, Vice, Radio-Canada, Global News: BC 1, CHOI 98.1 Radio X, ENERGIE 98.9, Vermont Public Radio, HuffPost, La Presse, and Le Journal de Montréal.) This appropriation is not linked to its preparation or consumption outside Quebec, but strictly to its presentation as a Canadian dish instead of a Québécois dish. Fabien-Ouellet explains:

as soon as a Quebec cultural trait begins to be appreciated internationally, it begins to be identified as typically Canadian, this prevents Quebec culture from shining, and becomes part of absorption and assimilation processes. All this is reminiscent of the reasons why Cajun cuisine is differentiated in the US context.

== In politics ==
In a Talking to Americans segment on the Canadian mock television news show This Hour Has 22 Minutes, during the 2000 US election, comedian Rick Mercer posed as a reporter and asked US politicians what they thought of "Prime Minister Jean Poutine" and his endorsement of George W. Bush for president. (The Prime Minister of Canada at the time was Jean Chrétien.) None of the interviewees noticed the insertion of "Poutine" and Bush pledged to "work closely" with Mr. Poutine. A few years later, when Bush made his first official visit to Canada as president, he joked in a speech, "There's a prominent citizen who endorsed me in the 2000 election, and I wanted a chance to finally thank him [...] I was hoping to meet Jean Poutine." The remark was met with laughter and applause.

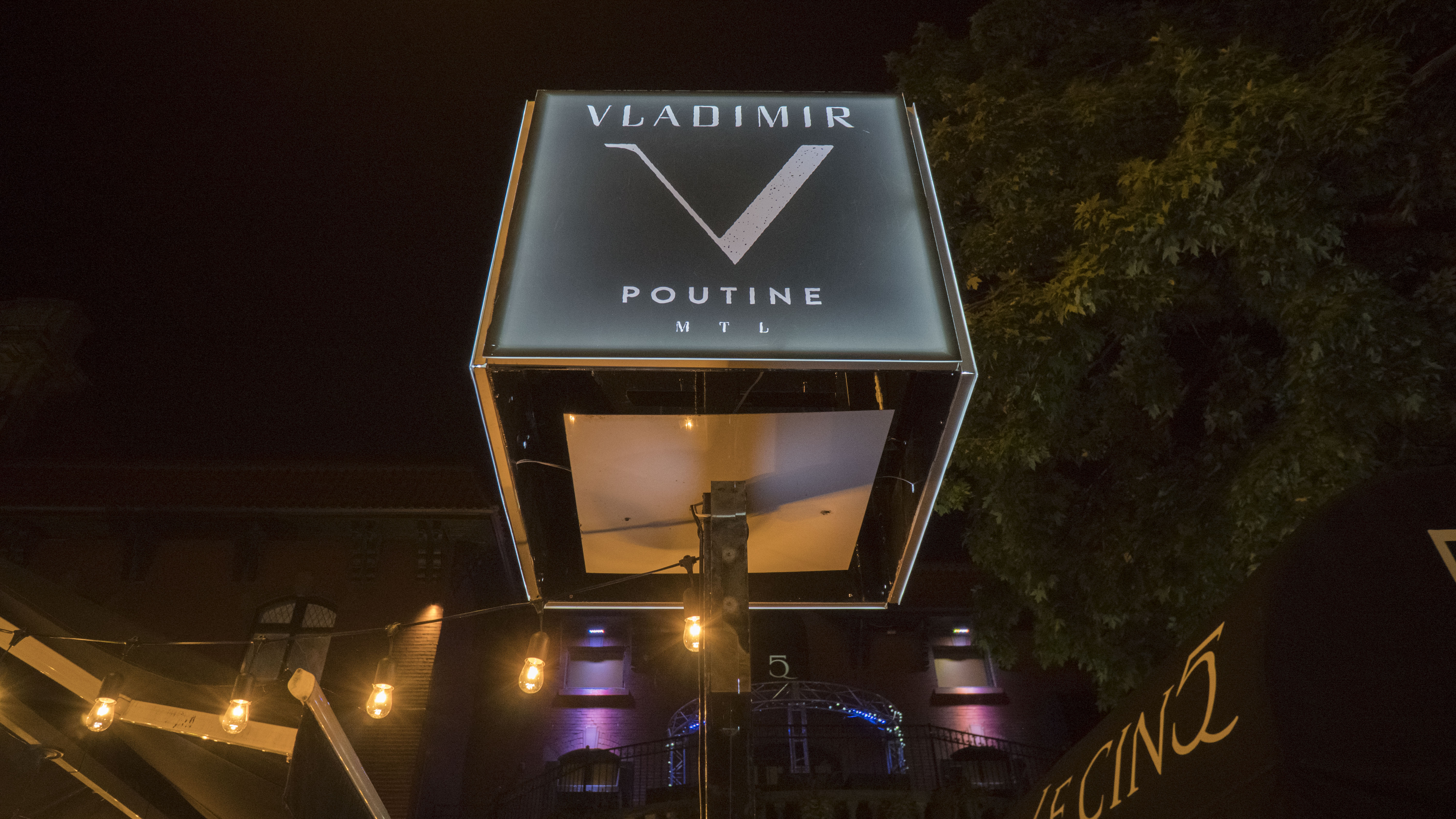
Signage outside Montreal's Vladimir Poutine restaurant

In French, Russian president Vladimir Putin's surname is spelled "Poutine", with the two having identical pronunciation. The similarity has been a source of confusion; in commenting on the Talking to Americans prank on Bush, Washington Post columnist Al Kamen mistakenly believed that Mercer's fictional Jean Poutine was a reference to Putin. In 2017, Russian-themed poutinerie Vladimir Poutine opened in Montreal, with dishes named for political figures from Rasputin to Donald Trump. In the week following the 2022 Russian invasion of Ukraine, frequent insults and threats were received by the three Maison de la Poutine restaurants in Paris, some stating a belief that they worked for the Russian state. Another poutinerie in Lyon changed the name of its 20-year signature dish, Vladimir poutine, stating that it "was no longer funny". In Quebec, Le Roy Jucep announced that it was retiring the word poutine in support of Ukraine and reverted to "fromage-patate-sauce" on its menus and branding.

During the 2011 Canadian federal election, some voters reported receiving robocalls claiming to be from Elections Canada, from a phone number registered to "Pierre Poutine". The calls targeted voters who had previously indicated they would not vote for the Conservative Party. The calls, made on election day or the day before, falsely advised voters that their polling station had been changed, in an attempt to prevent them from voting. The allegations became known as the Robocall scandal, and subsequent investigation by the Royal Canadian Mounted Police resulted in Michael Sona, a junior Conservative Party staffer, being convicted of violating the Elections Act.

Belgian Prime Minister Charles Michel had a Canadian lunch with counterpart Justin Trudeau on 16 June 2017, during which they ate hotdogs and poutine. Michel tweeted later that this was "A great way to meet a dear friend though our fries are better", referring to the popular claim that fries were originally invented in Belgium. In 2019, Canada attempted to garner support for its campaign for a non-permanent United Nations Security Council seat in the following year's election by serving poutine to UN diplomats.

== See also ==
- Cuisine of Quebec
- Cuisine of Canada

Related dishes

- Cheese fries – Fries with cheese
- Halal snack pack – Australian dish of fries topped with meat and sauce
- Poutine râpée – Traditional Acadian dumpling dish
- Lists
  - List of accompaniments to french fries
  - List of potato dishes
  - List of cheese dishes

Sauces

- Demi-glace – Brown sauce in French cuisine
- Velouté sauce – French sauce made from roux and light stock

Misc

- Port-Aux-Poutines – Canadian traditional music group
- List of Canadian inventions and discoveries
