= Metrovino =

Defunct restaurant in Portland, Oregon, U.S.

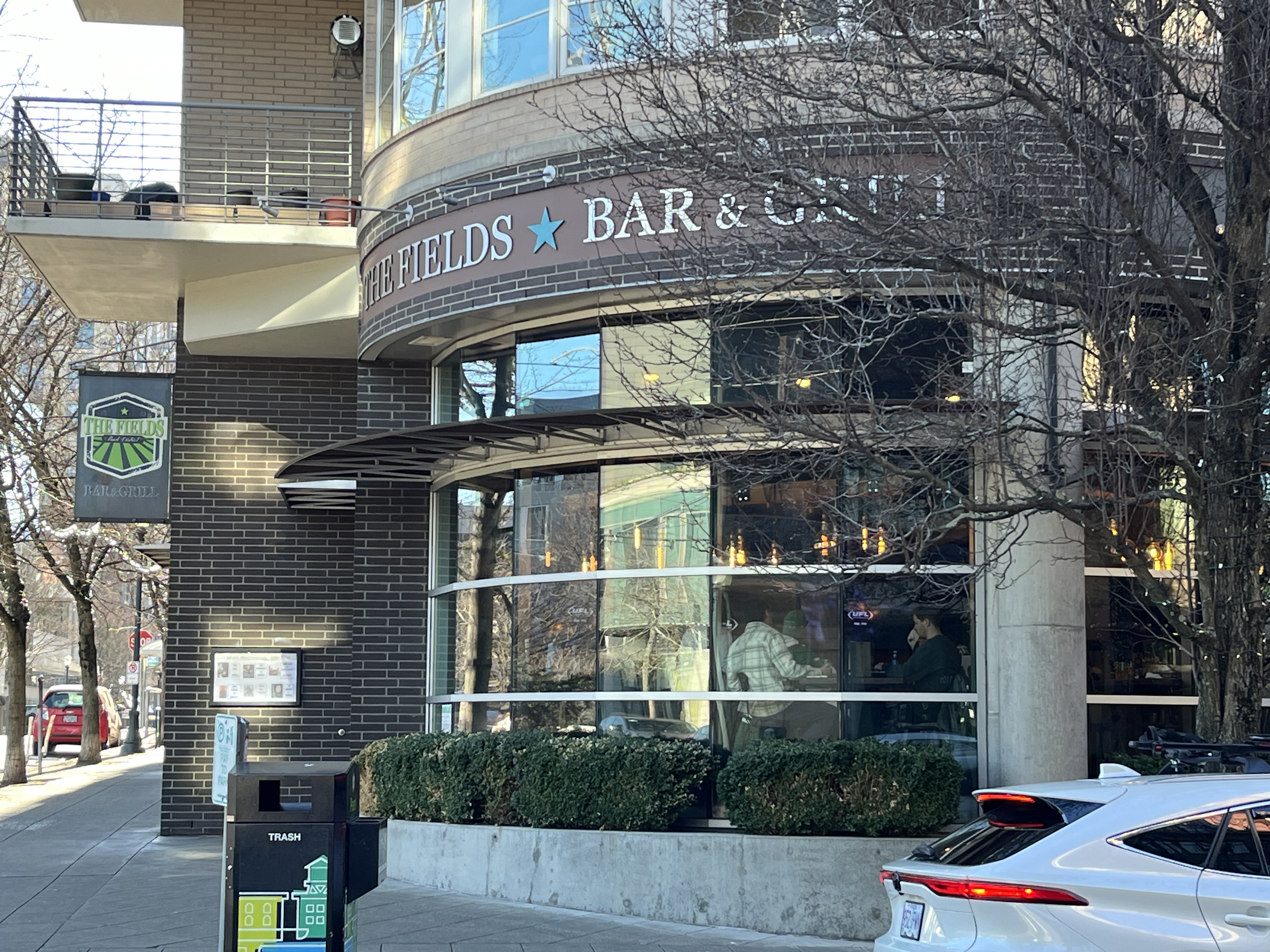
- Exterior of The Fields Bar and Grill (pictured in 2025), which operates in the space previously occupied by Metrovino, in northwest Portland's Pearl District
- Interactive map of Metrovino

Restaurant information
- Established: 2009
- Closed: September 2013
- Owner: Todd Steele
- Manager: Todd Steele
- Head chef: Greg Denton (2009–2012); Victor Deras (2012); Dustin See (2012–2013)
- Chef: Gabrielle Quiñonez Denton (2009–2012)
- Food type: Pacific Northwest
- Location: 1139 Northwest 11th Avenue, Portland, Multnomah, Oregon, 97209, United States
- Coordinates: 45.5314°N 122.6826°W

Metrovino was a Pacific Northwest restaurant in Portland, Oregon, in the United States. It opened in northwest Portland's Pearl District in 2009, with Greg Denton as executive chef. Todd Steele and his mother were co-owners. Other chefs included Denton's wife Gabrielle Quiñonez Denton and later Victor Deras and Dustin See, after the Dentons left in 2012.

In 2011, Metrovino was used as a filming location for the television series Leverage. Despite garnering a positive reception, the restaurant closed in September 2013 and was replaced by The Fields Bar and Grill.

== Description ==
The upscale restaurant and wine bar Metrovino operated in northwest Portland's Pearl District, along the 11th Avenue streetcar line. Metrovino had a temperature-controlled cabinet system and views of Tanner Springs Park. The restaurant served French-inspired Pacific Northwest cuisine.

=== Menu ===
The menu included chowder with fish and flour, tataki of yellowtail with cucumber and yuzu, and trout with spinach and potato purée and lobster sauce. Metrovino also served raclette, sopressata, and boiled potatoes; slow-roasted pork shoulder with chanterelles, heirloom beans, chimichurri, and broccolini; and French onion soup with cabbage, pork cheeks, and Gruyère cheese. Cheese plates, duck confit, foie gras, soufflés with white cheddar, and a sunny-side quail egg on pork belly were also available.

The brunch menu included Belgian waffles, biscuits and gravy, chicken-fried quail and waffles, a version of eggs Benedict with duck rillette, and Sicilian sausage with polenta and mushrooms. The restaurant also served a burger, tartines such as prosciutto and tuna, and a dish with grilled leg of lamb marinated with rosemary and garlic, served with spätzle and morel mushrooms, English peas, parsley, butter, parsley oil, and lamb jus.

Metrovino had approximately one hundred wine options, consisting of champagnes as well as red, sparkling, and white wines from around the world. The restaurant also served cocktails, including the Averna stout flip (Italian liqueur, Young's chocolate stout, whole egg), the seigle sour (spiced plantain syrup), and the Mexican train (mezcal and mole bitters). Drinks on the brunch menu included the Sherry Cobbler, which had Manzanilla sherry, orange, nutmeg, and sugar.

== History ==
Co-owners Todd Steele and his mother opened Metrovino in 2009, with Greg Denton as the executive chef. Steele, who was also Metrovino's general manager and wine director, wanted to operate along the streetcar line. He chose the location as he felt streetcars were a "romantic way to travel".

In 2010, Metrovino and Bethel Heights Vineyard partnered for the Winemaker Dinners series organized by the Classic Wines Auction, an annual charity event. Additionally, Denton and Steele were nominated in the Restaurant of the Year category of the annual Eater Awards and attended the ceremony in New York City. In March 2011, Metrovino hosted a weekend happy hour menu in honor of the James Beard Foundation Awards announcements. On the menu was a "meat donut", a doughnut with braised beef and marrow. The restaurant was also a filming location for the television series Leverage. According to Byron Beck of Eater Portland, Metrovino was used "as a location one of the characters visits on the show, including exterior and interior shots".

In January 2013, an Apple Maps error directed some customers to an incorrect address in southwest Portland. According to Eater Portland, the error resulted in phone calls requesting for clarification, causing the restaurant to lose up to $50,000 since the app's launch. A problem solving reporter from KATU was unable to acquire a comment from Apple. Metrovino celebrated its fourth anniversary in May. Steele suspended operations in September 2013, and The Fields Bar and Grill began operating in the space in 2014.

=== Bartenders ===
Kyle Webster was a mixologist until late 2010, when he left to work at St. Jack. Webster was replaced by bartender Jacob Grier, who implemented a new cocktail program in February 2011. Described by Eater Portland as a "beer-in-cocktails advocate", Grier debuted eleven new cocktails, including the Averna stout flip, the seigle sour, and the Mexican train.

In January 2012, Eater Portland credited Grier for the "bone luge", described as "the act of funneling a shot of liquor down a split marrow bone". Grier had come up with the concept in 2010 after drinking tequila through a cow's femur at Laurelhurst Market. The "bone luge" was added to Metrovino's menu within a year. After Metrovino closed, Grier worked at Hop & Vine and wrote a cookbook titled Cocktails on Tap: The Art of Mixing Spirits and Beer.

=== Chefs ===
In 2011, Denton hosted a one-time weekend dinner menu featuring roast suckling pig porchetta and roasted vegetables with a Meyer lemon vinaigrette and rosemary polenta croutons, as well as tête de cochon. He also competed on the restaurant's behalf in Wild About Game, an annual cook-off at Resort on the Mountain in Welches. Eater Portland said Denton won the competition for his duck dish, composed of a combination of duck and s'more-related ingredients. The winning food was served at Metrovino for one weekend only in September.

In late 2011, he and his spouse Gabrielle Quiñonez Denton, who was also a chef at Metrovino, announced plans to leave and start Ox. The couple continued working in Metrovino's kitchen until January 31, 2012. In January, Metrovino announced sous chef Victor Deras would become the head chef. Deras intended to replace Sunday's dinner with brunch, but he was replaced by sous chef Dustin See in March. See had joined Metrovino in 2010 and worked his way from line cook to sous chef. He took over the new brunch menu, which launched in April 2012.

While also adding the grilled leg of lamb dish, See hosted a Spanish-inspired dinner paired with selected sherries and a four-course 1980s-themed dinner in which he offered "interpretations of '80s-era recipes" from Daniel Boulud, Hubert Keller, and Marco Pierre White, also highlighting cellared wines from the decade.

== Reception ==
In 2010, Portland Monthly's Mike Thelin said Denton added flair to Pacific Northwest ingredients. Metrovino's burger was declared the city's best in a 2010 burger survey conducted by Willamette Week. Eater Portland included the Sherry Cobbler in a 2012 overview of the city's best non-Bloody brunch cocktails. Covering the "off-the-menu specials" made available by local restaurants in conjunction with Feast Portland in 2012, which included the "bone luge", Eater Portland called Metrovino the "most Portland-y Pearl District spot".

In 2013, David Sarasohn of The Oregonian gave Metrovino a rating of "B+". He complimented the "pungent, intricate dishes designed to delve into wine", such as the charcuterie board and wagyu carpaccio, among other "unexpected" options. In Thrillist's 2023 overview of Portland's best wings, Andy Kryza called Metrovino "swank" and said the chicken wing confit were "wonderfully" salty, "super" crunchy on the outside, and "impossibly" tender on the inside. After Metrovino's closure, the magazine Oregon Business called the restaurant "beloved".

== See also ==
- List of Pacific Northwest restaurants
