= The Fields Bar and Grill =

Sports bar and restaurant in Portland, Oregon, U.S.

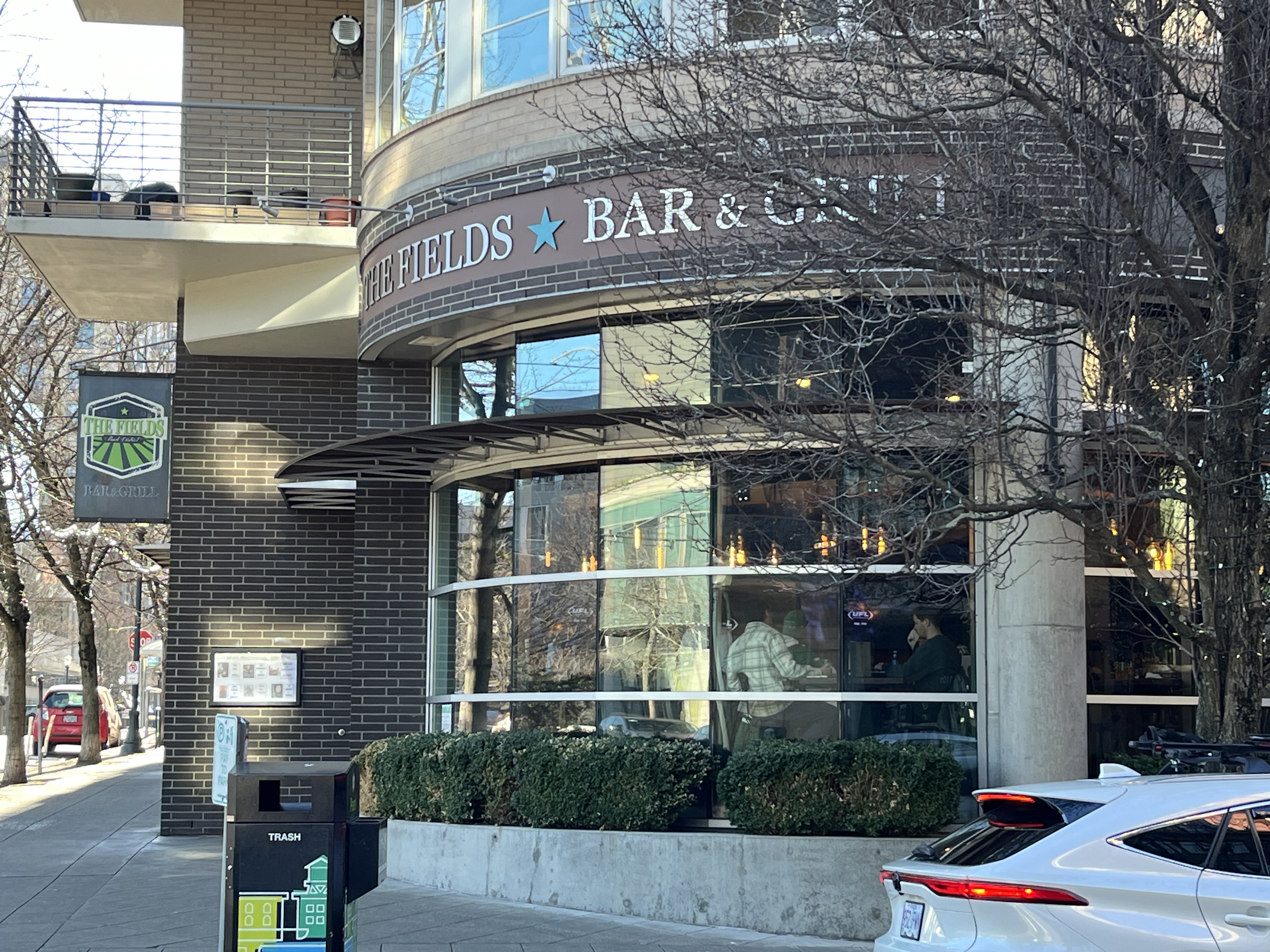
- The restaurant's exterior, 2025
- Interactive map of The Fields Bar and Grill

Restaurant information
- Food type: American
- Location: 1139 Northwest 11th Avenue, Portland, Multnomah, Oregon, 97209, United States
- Coordinates: 45.5313°N 122.6826°W
- Website: thefieldspdx.com

The Fields Bar and Grill is a sports bar and restaurant in Portland, Oregon's Pearl District, in the United States.

== Description ==
The Fields Bar and Grill is a sports bar and restaurant at the intersection of 11th and Northrup in northwest Portland's Pearl District. The menu has American cuisine such as burgers, sandwiches, and a variety of entrees, including kailua pig with macaroni salad, sockeye salmon in a pesto-avocado butter, and steak and shrimp scampi; small plates include avocado fries and steak bites with a veal demi-glaze. The restaurant has also served brunch with bottomless mimosas. In 2016, The Oregonian described The Fields as "a dedicated Blazers bar serving bar bites and more", with 13 high-definition televisions.

== History ==
The Fields opened in April 2014, in the space previously occupied by Metrovino.

Prior to the COVID-19 pandemic, the business employed 21 people. Owners Jim Rice and his wife were forced to cut back drastically during the pandemic, reducing the number of employees to three. Outdoor seating capacity was only 14, and the restaurant's windows had to be boarded during a long period of protests. The Fields offered a special Thanksgiving menu via takeout service in November 2020. In February 2021, Rice expressed frustration with vandalism which occurred during protests. The Fields had 16 employees, as of April 2021. In June, a "confrontation between business owners, residents and demonstrators" occurred outside the restaurant. All staff had received COVID-19 vaccinations, as of July. During the July 4 weekend, when The Fields first operated at full capacity since the start of the pandemic, a sign displayed outside said "We Survived! Thank you!!"

== Reception ==
Alex Frane of Eater Portland included The Fields on his 2019 list of "15 Ideal Portland Sports Bars for Catching the Game", writing: "A more upscale take on a classic sports bar, The Fields does away with the neon bar signs and team posters for large, window-lined walls and industrial chic vibes. The menu follows suit, offering elevated takes on sports bar staples, both in quality and price, like burgers, chicken strips, and tacos. It also offers an appreciable cocktail list, something not every sports bar in town can claim. Though the bar screens all the major and local games, it is Beaver territory, so Ducks beware."
