= Cheese curd =

Unaged curdled milk product

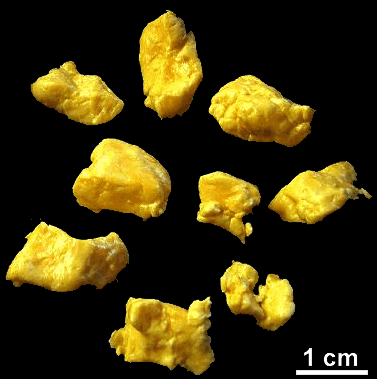
Cheese curds

Cheese curds are moist pieces of curdled milk, eaten either alone as a snack, or used in prepared dishes. They are consumed throughout the United States (especially in the Midwest) and Canada. In addition to being eaten alone, they are popular in Quebec, as part of the dish poutine (made of French fries topped with cheese curds and gravy), and in Wisconsin and Minnesota where they can be served breaded (or battered) and deep fried. Curds are sometimes referred to as "squeaky cheese" or fromage en grain.

== Production ==
Cheese curds are made from fresh pasteurized milk to which cheese culture and rennet are added. After the milk curdles it is then cut into cubes; the result is a mixture of whey and curd, which then forms a substance that is extremely clumpy. This mixture is then cooked and pressed to release the whey from the curd, creating the final product.

== Characteristics ==
Cheese curds have a mild flavor, that depends on the process by which they were made. They range in color from white to yellow and orange. They have a similar firmness and density to mozzarella cheese, but with a springy or rubbery texture. Fresh curds squeak against the teeth when bitten into. This "squeak" has been described by The New York Times as sounding like "balloons trying to neck". After 12 hours, even under refrigeration, cheese curds lose much of their "fresh" characteristic, particularly the "squeak", due to moisture entering the curd. Keeping them at room temperature can preserve the squeakiness.

== Uses ==
=== Fresh ===
Fresh cheese curds are often eaten as a snack, finger food, or an appetizer. They may be served alone, dressed with an additional flavor, or with another food, such as a small smoked sausage or piece of cured pork, with the elements skewered together on a toothpick. Examples of flavorings applied to fresh curds include jalapeño chili peppers, garlic, various herbs, or spice blends such as Cajun seasoning, with garlic and dill on cheddar curds being a popular combination. They are often served by Russian Mennonites as part of a traditional light lunch called faspa.

=== Fried cheese curds ===
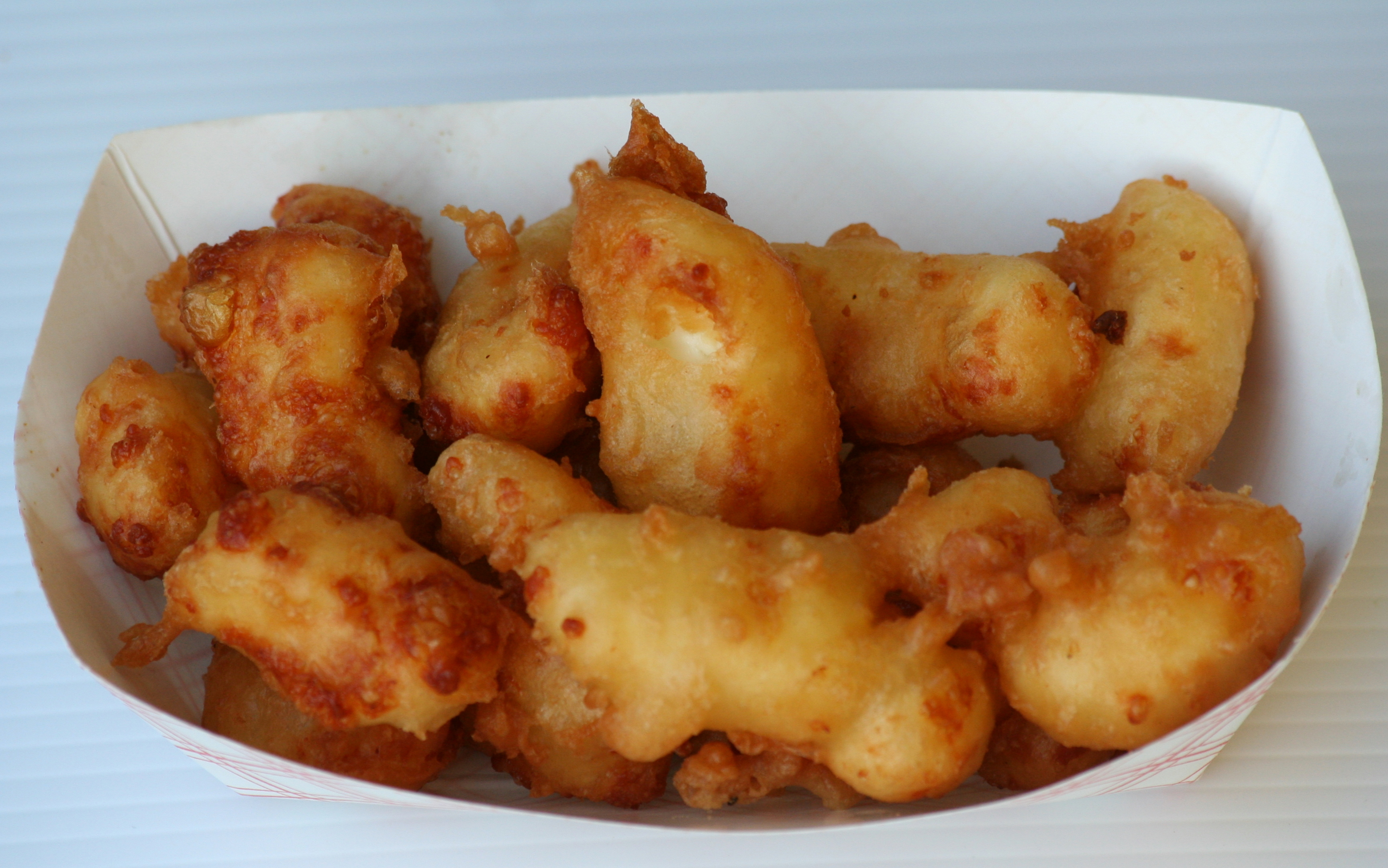
Deep-fried cheese curds

Deep-fried cheese curds are often found at carnivals and fairs, and often local non-chain fast-food restaurants and at regular restaurants and bars, as well as a few chain restaurants of local origin, such as Culver's and Dairy Queen.

Minnesota style deep-fried cheese curds are covered with a batter similar to one used for onion rings, and placed in a deep fryer. Wisconsin style deep-fried cheese curds use breading instead of batter. They are sometimes served with a side of ketchup, marinara sauce, or ranch dressing.

In many areas where fried cheese curds are common, the term "cheese curds", or simply "curds", refers to the fried variety; non-fried curds are distinguished by calling them "raw" or "plain" cheese curds.

In some areas, deep-fried cheese curds are also known as cheeseballs, whereas in Wisconsin they are usually referred to as fried curds.

=== Poutine ===
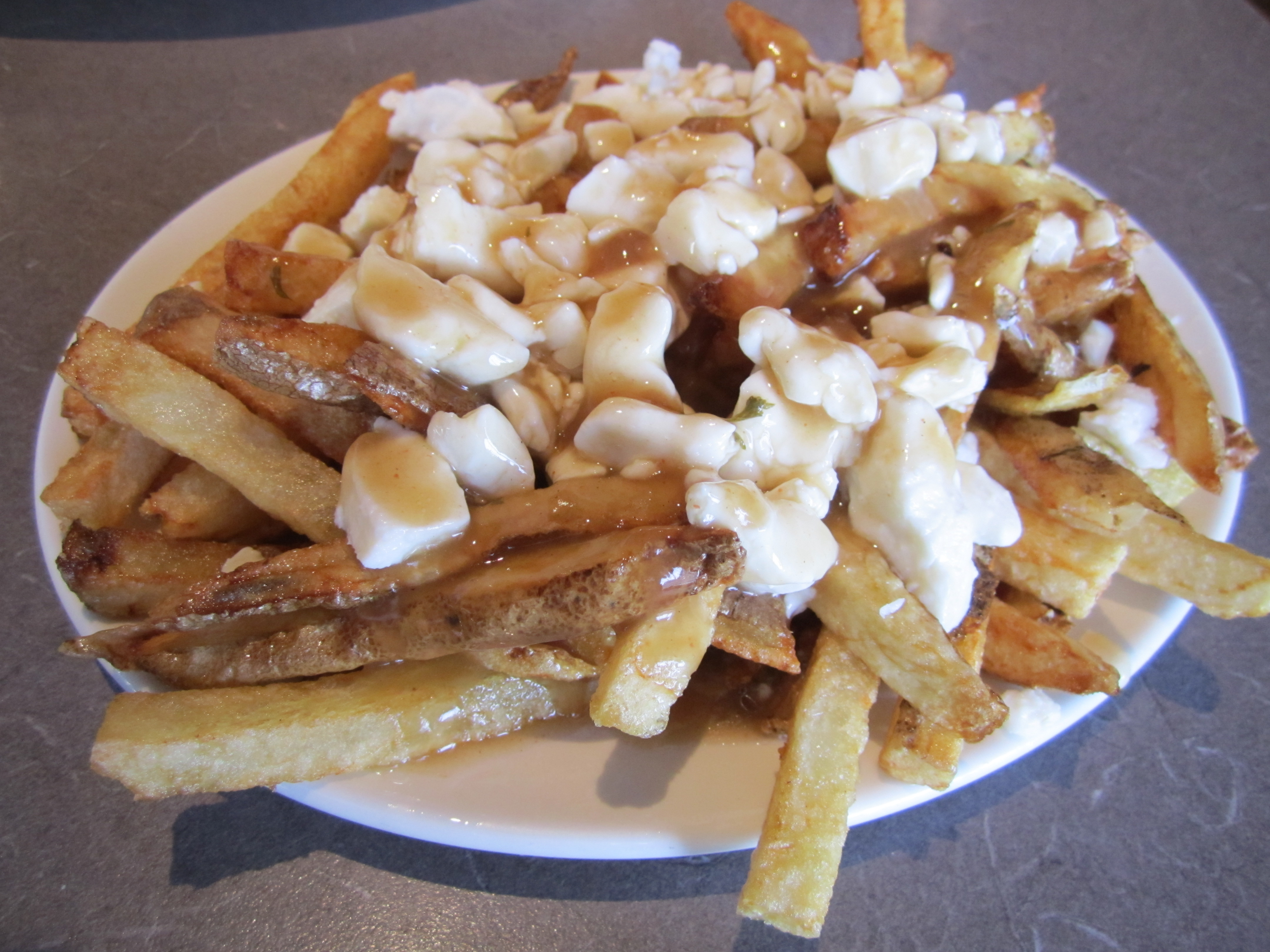
Poutine with squeaky cheese

Cheese curds are a main ingredient in poutine, which originated in the 1950s in rural Quebec, Canada. It consists of french fries topped with fresh cheese curds, covered with brown gravy and sometimes additional ingredients.

== See also ==
- Fried cheese
- Halloumi
- Leipäjuusto (Finnish squeaky cheese)
- List of cheeses
