= Smoke's Poutinerie =

Canadian poutine franchise

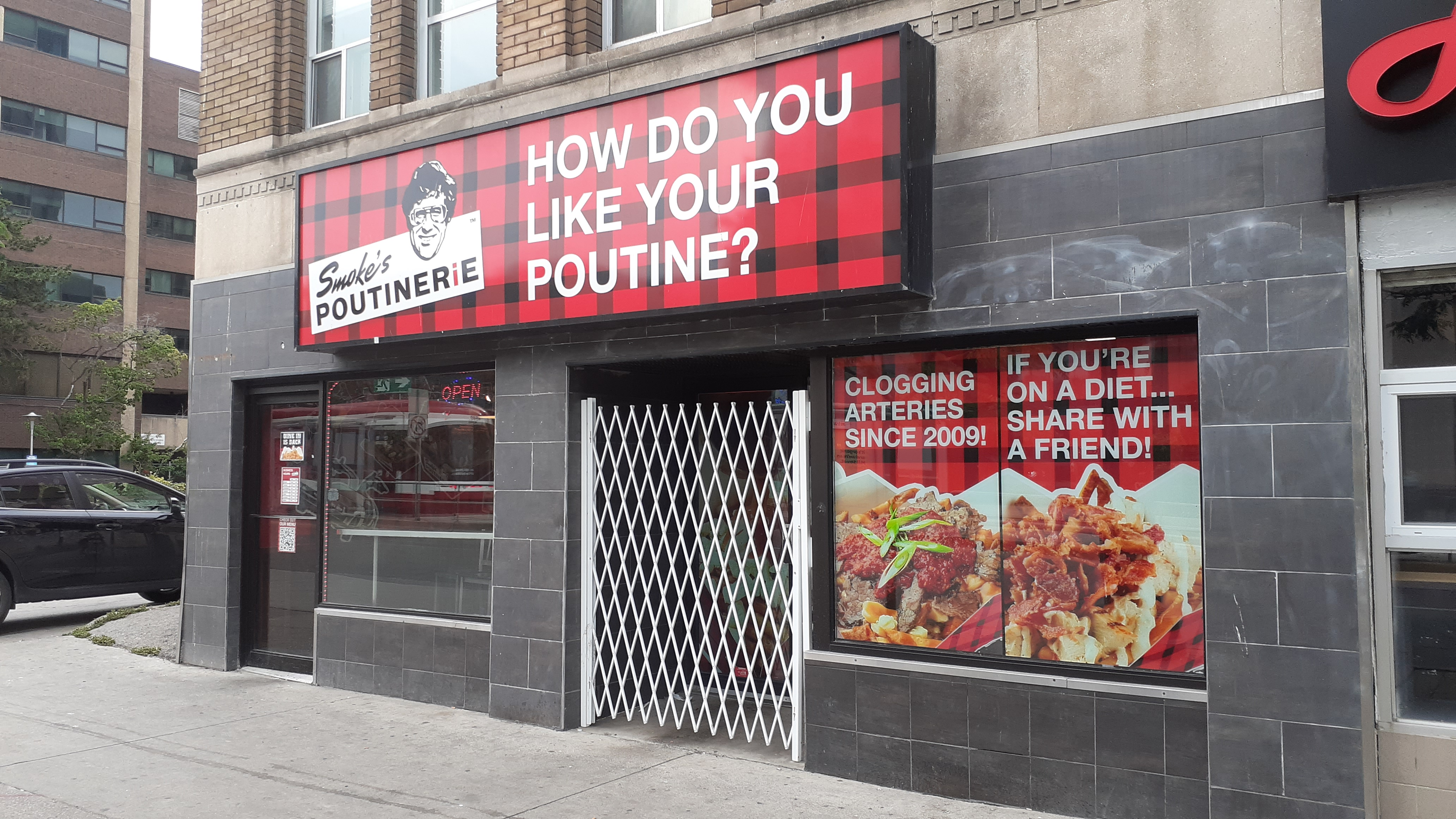
- Smoke's Poutinerie in Toronto in 2022
- Industry: Restaurants
- Founded: 2008
- Founder: Ryan Smolkin
- Headquarters: Ajax, Ontario, Canada
- Area served: Canada
- Products: Poutine
- Website: SmokesPoutinerie.com

Smoke's Poutinerie is a Canadian poutine restaurant franchise founded by Ryan Smolkin.

== History ==
Ryan Smolkin, the founder of Smoke's Poutinerie, worked alongside Toronto-based restaurant consultants The Fifteen Group when starting out. He needed to gain experience in the restaurant industry. With the help of The Fifteen Group's chef, the original gravy recipe was developed.

In 2008, Smoke's Poutinerie opened its first location in Toronto. It was the first poutine-oriented restaurant in the city.

In 2016, Smoke's Poutinerie had 76 restaurants in Canada and 5 in the United States. They planned to expand the company internationally and open 1,300 restaurants around the world by 2020. Smoke's Poutinerie had already started on this expansion, having sold franchises to franchisees in the United States. By 2017, the restaurant had some 150 locations across Canada and United States. Smoke's opened its first location in the US, in Berkeley, California in 2014, which closed in April 2018. The four other U.S. locations have also closed. According to their websites, as of August 20, 2022, there are currently 49 locations all in Canada.

Ryan Smolkin died October 29, 2023, from complications following surgery. He was 50 years old.

== Poutine Eating Championship ==
The Annual Smoke's Poutinerie World Poutine Eating Championship crowns a new champion each year, and in 2016 a world record was broken for poutine eating. The event includes 3 levels of poutine eating including amateur, professional, and destroyer.

In that same year, the event focused on raising money for the Friends of We Care charity and raised over $50,000 to send disabled children to camp.

== Competition ==
Smoke's Poutinerie had its fair share of competitiveness. Most large Canadian restaurant chains already had a basic poutine item on their menu. Smoke's Poutinerie opened its second location in Toronto by 2015, and Poutineville which as of May 2019, has 6 restaurants in Quebec.

Smoke's Poutinerie's further competition has come from corporate businesses. McDonald's expanded its poutine product from being only in Quebec, Canada, to the entire country. In 2012, Wendy's added poutine to their menu as Canada's national dish. More companies have added poutine to their menus including Burger King, A&W, KFC and Popeyes. In Waterloo, Ontario, an establishment branded as Mike's Poutine House, a faux high-end chain-esque knock-off poutinerie of Smoke's has opened in July 2025 across the street from a Smoke's outlet of the University Commons plaza on King Street in a student rental housing complex but peculiarly facing the rear residential street.

== See also ==
- List of Canadian restaurant chains
