= Ashton (restaurant chain) =

Restaurant chain in Quebec, Canada

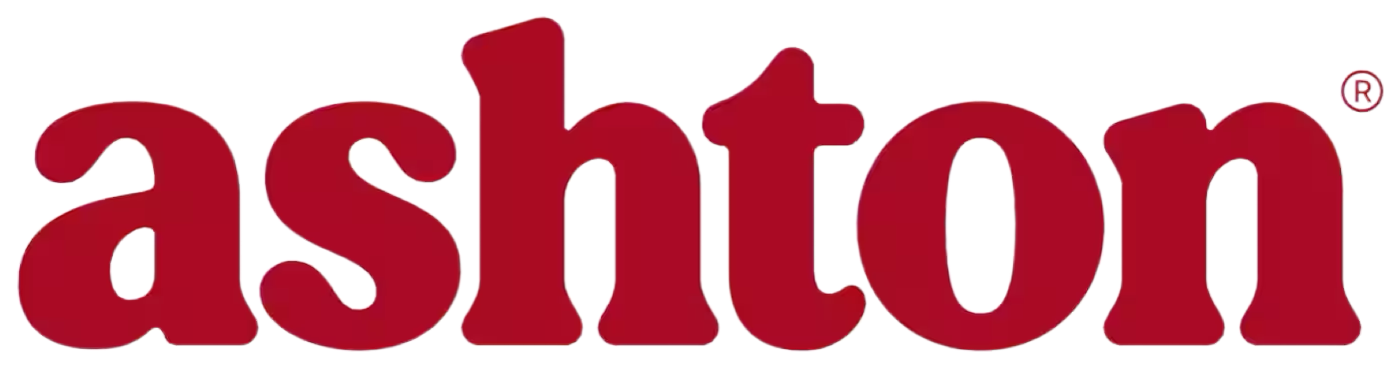

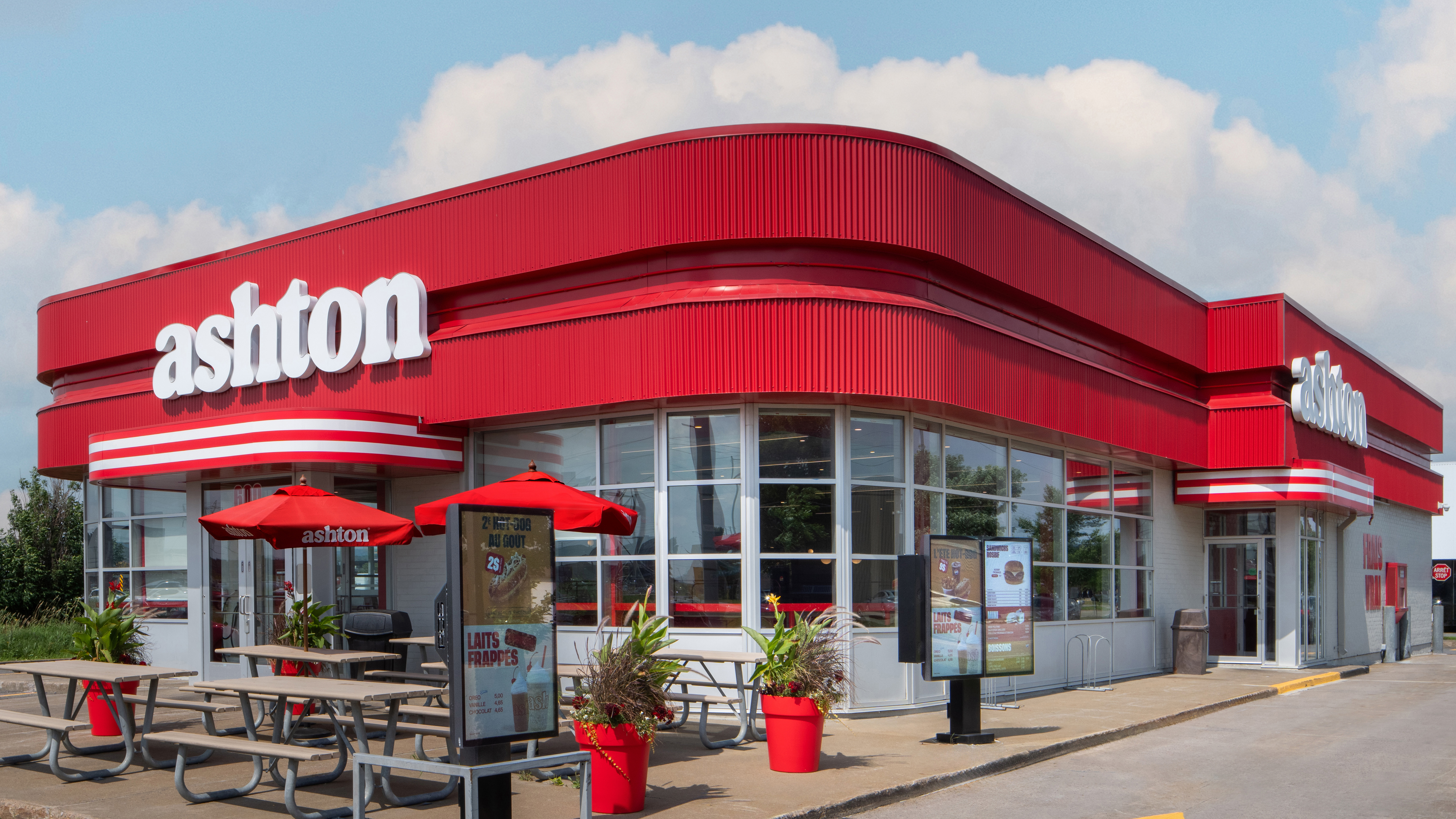
- Restaurant in the rue du Marais, Quebec City
- Industry: Restaurants
- Genre: Fast food restaurant
- Founded: 1969
- Area served: Quebec, Canada
- Products: Poutine; Hamburgers; Hot dogs
- Website: ashtonrestaurants.ca

Ashton (corporately styled as "ashton” and formerly known as Chez Ashton) is a popular fast food restaurant in Quebec, Canada famous for its poutine. The franchise includes 25 restaurants in the Quebec City region.

== History ==
Chez Ashton's origins can be traced to a traveling snack cart started by Ashton Leblond in 1969. It was not until 1972, however, that poutine was first offered. Ashton hooked his customers by initially giving free samples of his poutine, which at the time was not popular in Quebec City. The enterprise grew in popularity until Leblond was able to open a restaurant with a dining room open year-round in 1976. In the 1980s, the chain tried to enter Montreal but failed.

In 2019, the chain decided to add a surcharge to meals served past midnight, to compensate for rising labour costs. After the COVID-19 pandemic, Leblond wanted to move on from the restaurant business, receiving offers from several fast food chains. He eventually sold his franchise to a couple, Émily Adam and Jean-Christophe Lirette, in 2022, stating he wanted to keep it in local control. After the purchase, they introduced an expanded menu, new design for the restaurant, and changed the name from Chez Ashton to just Ashton.
