= Dictionnaire historique du français québécois =

Dictionary of French used in Quebec, Canada

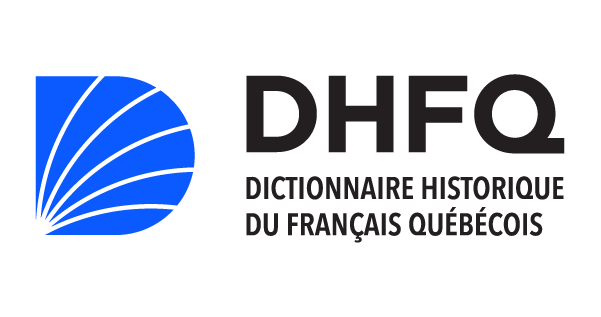

The Dictionnaire historique du français québécois (French pronunciation: [diksjɔnɛːʁ istɔʁik dy fʁɑ̃sɛ kebekwa]; Historical Dictionary of Quebec French) is a book published by the Trésor de la langue française au Québec project, under the direction of Claude Poirier. The book was first published in 1998 by les Presses de l'Université Laval.

This dictionary provides information on the origin and history of French words and expressions in Quebec. The information in the book is focused on words which are not commonly used in "international" French.

== See also ==
- Quebec French lexicon
