= Lobster sauce =

Sauce in North American Chinese cuisine

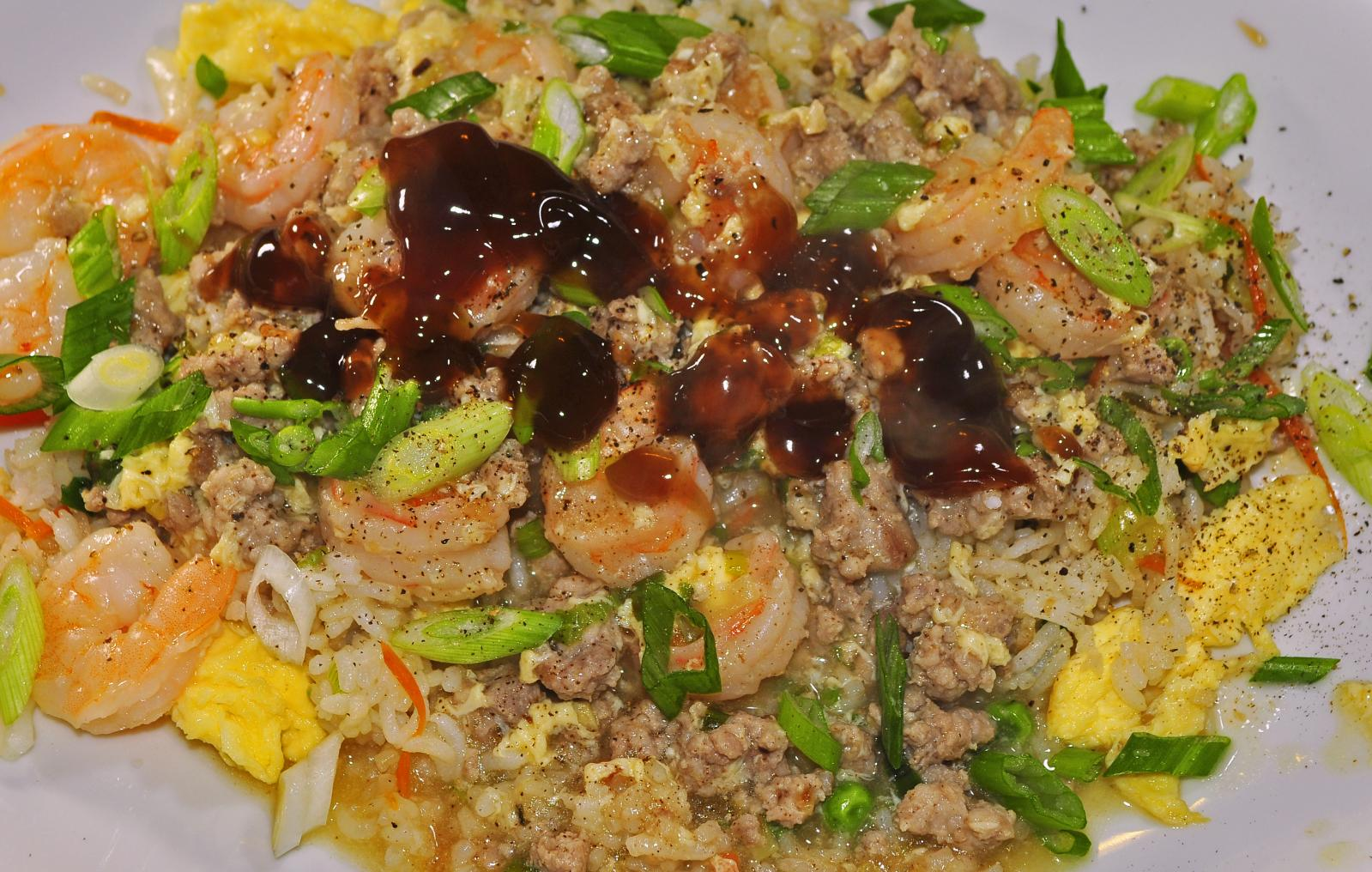
Shrimp in lobster sauce

Lobster sauce is a type of sauce used in American-Chinese and Canadian-Chinese cuisine. It is also sometimes found in Polynesian-influenced Chinese food. It is a type of "white sauce" within Chinese cooking, meaning that it is mild and based on meat stock as opposed to soy sauce.

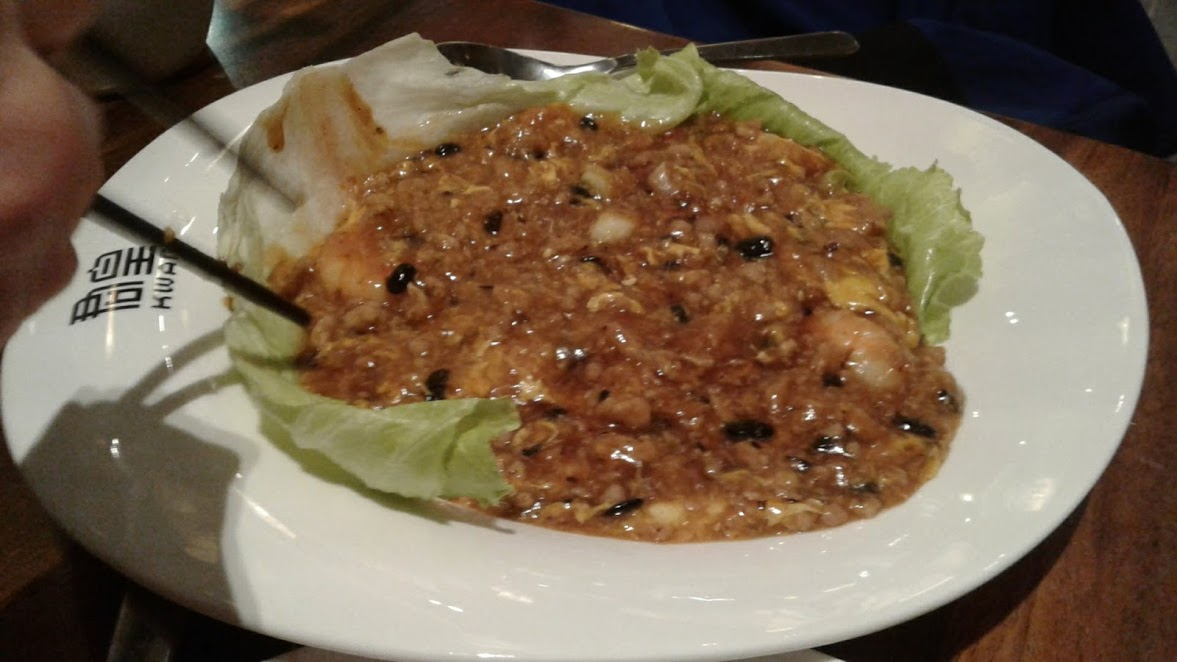
The version of lobster sauce used in Cantonese cuisine

The sauce itself does not contain any lobster, and may vary in preparation method from place to place or restaurant to restaurant. It can contain chicken broth, garlic, ginger, green onions, fermented black beans, and eggs, and is thickened with starch. Some recipes incorporate pork mince and soy sauce. The colour varies from being pale white to brown, or to a yellow, depending on the quantity of soy sauce used and how the eggs are incorporated into the sauce. Lobster sauce in most of New England, where it is a thicker, brown sauce, is the exception.

== Origin ==
"Lobster sauce" was invented in North America by Chinese restaurateurs inspired by a method of preparing lobster in Cantonese cuisine where ginger, green onions, and soy sauce were used as stir-fry seasoning. The seasoning mixture was made into a sauce that was used in cooking lobster. Due to the cost of serving lobster for restaurateurs and their customers, shrimp was eventually substituted in the recipe resulting in a dish commonly known as "Shrimp with Lobster Sauce" (Chinese: 蝦龍糊).
